

233001–233100 

|-bgcolor=#d6d6d6
| 233001 ||  || — || March 9, 2005 || Mount Lemmon || Mount Lemmon Survey || — || align=right | 4.1 km || 
|-id=002 bgcolor=#d6d6d6
| 233002 ||  || — || March 9, 2005 || Siding Spring || SSS || LIX || align=right | 6.3 km || 
|-id=003 bgcolor=#d6d6d6
| 233003 ||  || — || March 10, 2005 || Siding Spring || SSS || — || align=right | 3.1 km || 
|-id=004 bgcolor=#d6d6d6
| 233004 ||  || — || March 11, 2005 || Mount Lemmon || Mount Lemmon Survey || — || align=right | 4.7 km || 
|-id=005 bgcolor=#d6d6d6
| 233005 ||  || — || March 12, 2005 || Mount Lemmon || Mount Lemmon Survey || — || align=right | 3.4 km || 
|-id=006 bgcolor=#d6d6d6
| 233006 ||  || — || March 11, 2005 || Kitt Peak || Spacewatch || — || align=right | 4.3 km || 
|-id=007 bgcolor=#d6d6d6
| 233007 ||  || — || March 13, 2005 || Catalina || CSS || — || align=right | 4.6 km || 
|-id=008 bgcolor=#d6d6d6
| 233008 ||  || — || March 13, 2005 || Catalina || CSS || — || align=right | 4.1 km || 
|-id=009 bgcolor=#d6d6d6
| 233009 ||  || — || March 11, 2005 || Mount Lemmon || Mount Lemmon Survey || — || align=right | 3.9 km || 
|-id=010 bgcolor=#d6d6d6
| 233010 ||  || — || March 4, 2005 || Kitt Peak || Spacewatch || HYG || align=right | 3.9 km || 
|-id=011 bgcolor=#d6d6d6
| 233011 ||  || — || March 7, 2005 || Socorro || LINEAR || EMA || align=right | 6.5 km || 
|-id=012 bgcolor=#d6d6d6
| 233012 ||  || — || March 7, 2005 || Socorro || LINEAR || — || align=right | 3.5 km || 
|-id=013 bgcolor=#d6d6d6
| 233013 ||  || — || March 8, 2005 || Mount Lemmon || Mount Lemmon Survey || — || align=right | 3.9 km || 
|-id=014 bgcolor=#d6d6d6
| 233014 ||  || — || March 8, 2005 || Mount Lemmon || Mount Lemmon Survey || EOS || align=right | 2.6 km || 
|-id=015 bgcolor=#d6d6d6
| 233015 ||  || — || March 10, 2005 || Mount Lemmon || Mount Lemmon Survey || HYG || align=right | 4.4 km || 
|-id=016 bgcolor=#d6d6d6
| 233016 ||  || — || March 12, 2005 || Socorro || LINEAR || Tj (2.93) || align=right | 4.4 km || 
|-id=017 bgcolor=#d6d6d6
| 233017 ||  || — || March 12, 2005 || Kitt Peak || Spacewatch || THM || align=right | 3.5 km || 
|-id=018 bgcolor=#d6d6d6
| 233018 ||  || — || March 12, 2005 || Kitt Peak || Spacewatch || — || align=right | 4.2 km || 
|-id=019 bgcolor=#d6d6d6
| 233019 ||  || — || March 10, 2005 || Catalina || CSS || — || align=right | 4.7 km || 
|-id=020 bgcolor=#d6d6d6
| 233020 ||  || — || March 11, 2005 || Mount Lemmon || Mount Lemmon Survey || HYG || align=right | 2.7 km || 
|-id=021 bgcolor=#d6d6d6
| 233021 ||  || — || March 11, 2005 || Mount Lemmon || Mount Lemmon Survey || — || align=right | 3.6 km || 
|-id=022 bgcolor=#d6d6d6
| 233022 ||  || — || March 12, 2005 || Socorro || LINEAR || EOS || align=right | 2.9 km || 
|-id=023 bgcolor=#d6d6d6
| 233023 ||  || — || March 13, 2005 || Kitt Peak || Spacewatch || — || align=right | 3.2 km || 
|-id=024 bgcolor=#E9E9E9
| 233024 ||  || — || March 15, 2005 || Mount Lemmon || Mount Lemmon Survey || — || align=right | 3.1 km || 
|-id=025 bgcolor=#E9E9E9
| 233025 ||  || — || March 1, 2005 || Catalina || CSS || JUN || align=right | 1.7 km || 
|-id=026 bgcolor=#d6d6d6
| 233026 ||  || — || March 3, 2005 || Catalina || CSS || — || align=right | 3.1 km || 
|-id=027 bgcolor=#d6d6d6
| 233027 ||  || — || March 8, 2005 || Catalina || CSS || — || align=right | 3.8 km || 
|-id=028 bgcolor=#E9E9E9
| 233028 ||  || — || March 9, 2005 || Socorro || LINEAR || — || align=right | 3.1 km || 
|-id=029 bgcolor=#d6d6d6
| 233029 ||  || — || March 10, 2005 || Catalina || CSS || — || align=right | 4.9 km || 
|-id=030 bgcolor=#d6d6d6
| 233030 ||  || — || March 11, 2005 || Anderson Mesa || LONEOS || — || align=right | 4.5 km || 
|-id=031 bgcolor=#d6d6d6
| 233031 ||  || — || March 9, 2005 || Siding Spring || SSS || TIR || align=right | 3.4 km || 
|-id=032 bgcolor=#E9E9E9
| 233032 ||  || — || March 10, 2005 || Catalina || CSS || DOR || align=right | 3.6 km || 
|-id=033 bgcolor=#d6d6d6
| 233033 ||  || — || March 11, 2005 || Catalina || CSS || — || align=right | 4.5 km || 
|-id=034 bgcolor=#d6d6d6
| 233034 ||  || — || March 13, 2005 || Catalina || CSS || — || align=right | 3.9 km || 
|-id=035 bgcolor=#d6d6d6
| 233035 ||  || — || March 3, 2005 || Catalina || CSS || — || align=right | 4.2 km || 
|-id=036 bgcolor=#d6d6d6
| 233036 ||  || — || March 2, 2005 || Catalina || CSS || — || align=right | 4.5 km || 
|-id=037 bgcolor=#d6d6d6
| 233037 ||  || — || March 30, 2005 || Catalina || CSS || LUT || align=right | 6.4 km || 
|-id=038 bgcolor=#E9E9E9
| 233038 ||  || — || April 1, 2005 || Catalina || CSS || — || align=right | 3.1 km || 
|-id=039 bgcolor=#d6d6d6
| 233039 ||  || — || April 1, 2005 || Anderson Mesa || LONEOS || — || align=right | 4.1 km || 
|-id=040 bgcolor=#d6d6d6
| 233040 ||  || — || April 2, 2005 || Palomar || NEAT || — || align=right | 4.2 km || 
|-id=041 bgcolor=#d6d6d6
| 233041 ||  || — || April 4, 2005 || Catalina || CSS || — || align=right | 4.8 km || 
|-id=042 bgcolor=#d6d6d6
| 233042 ||  || — || April 3, 2005 || Palomar || NEAT || THM || align=right | 3.8 km || 
|-id=043 bgcolor=#d6d6d6
| 233043 ||  || — || April 4, 2005 || Kitt Peak || Spacewatch || — || align=right | 3.5 km || 
|-id=044 bgcolor=#d6d6d6
| 233044 ||  || — || April 4, 2005 || Črni Vrh || Črni Vrh || EUP || align=right | 6.4 km || 
|-id=045 bgcolor=#d6d6d6
| 233045 ||  || — || April 2, 2005 || Catalina || CSS || — || align=right | 6.8 km || 
|-id=046 bgcolor=#E9E9E9
| 233046 ||  || — || April 5, 2005 || Mount Lemmon || Mount Lemmon Survey || — || align=right | 2.5 km || 
|-id=047 bgcolor=#d6d6d6
| 233047 ||  || — || April 5, 2005 || Mount Lemmon || Mount Lemmon Survey || — || align=right | 4.0 km || 
|-id=048 bgcolor=#d6d6d6
| 233048 ||  || — || April 5, 2005 || Mount Lemmon || Mount Lemmon Survey || THM || align=right | 3.7 km || 
|-id=049 bgcolor=#d6d6d6
| 233049 ||  || — || April 6, 2005 || Mount Lemmon || Mount Lemmon Survey || — || align=right | 6.0 km || 
|-id=050 bgcolor=#d6d6d6
| 233050 ||  || — || April 2, 2005 || Catalina || CSS || ALA || align=right | 4.3 km || 
|-id=051 bgcolor=#d6d6d6
| 233051 ||  || — || April 6, 2005 || Catalina || CSS || — || align=right | 5.9 km || 
|-id=052 bgcolor=#d6d6d6
| 233052 ||  || — || April 6, 2005 || Catalina || CSS || — || align=right | 2.4 km || 
|-id=053 bgcolor=#d6d6d6
| 233053 ||  || — || April 7, 2005 || Kitt Peak || Spacewatch || — || align=right | 4.7 km || 
|-id=054 bgcolor=#d6d6d6
| 233054 ||  || — || April 5, 2005 || Anderson Mesa || LONEOS || — || align=right | 3.7 km || 
|-id=055 bgcolor=#d6d6d6
| 233055 ||  || — || April 2, 2005 || Kitt Peak || Spacewatch || — || align=right | 3.1 km || 
|-id=056 bgcolor=#d6d6d6
| 233056 ||  || — || April 6, 2005 || Kitt Peak || Spacewatch || — || align=right | 3.7 km || 
|-id=057 bgcolor=#d6d6d6
| 233057 ||  || — || April 10, 2005 || Mount Lemmon || Mount Lemmon Survey || THM || align=right | 3.9 km || 
|-id=058 bgcolor=#d6d6d6
| 233058 ||  || — || April 12, 2005 || Socorro || LINEAR || EUP || align=right | 5.2 km || 
|-id=059 bgcolor=#d6d6d6
| 233059 ||  || — || April 10, 2005 || Kitt Peak || Spacewatch || LIX || align=right | 4.9 km || 
|-id=060 bgcolor=#d6d6d6
| 233060 ||  || — || April 9, 2005 || Socorro || LINEAR || ALA || align=right | 3.0 km || 
|-id=061 bgcolor=#d6d6d6
| 233061 ||  || — || April 11, 2005 || Kitt Peak || Spacewatch || — || align=right | 3.0 km || 
|-id=062 bgcolor=#d6d6d6
| 233062 ||  || — || April 11, 2005 || Kitt Peak || Spacewatch || — || align=right | 2.8 km || 
|-id=063 bgcolor=#d6d6d6
| 233063 ||  || — || April 14, 2005 || Kitt Peak || Spacewatch || THM || align=right | 2.8 km || 
|-id=064 bgcolor=#d6d6d6
| 233064 ||  || — || April 11, 2005 || Mount Lemmon || Mount Lemmon Survey || — || align=right | 3.4 km || 
|-id=065 bgcolor=#d6d6d6
| 233065 ||  || — || April 11, 2005 || Mount Lemmon || Mount Lemmon Survey || HYG || align=right | 3.0 km || 
|-id=066 bgcolor=#d6d6d6
| 233066 ||  || — || April 1, 2005 || Catalina || CSS || — || align=right | 5.5 km || 
|-id=067 bgcolor=#d6d6d6
| 233067 ||  || — || May 3, 2005 || Socorro || LINEAR || — || align=right | 3.3 km || 
|-id=068 bgcolor=#d6d6d6
| 233068 ||  || — || May 1, 2005 || Siding Spring || SSS || — || align=right | 4.2 km || 
|-id=069 bgcolor=#d6d6d6
| 233069 ||  || — || May 4, 2005 || Catalina || CSS || 7:4 || align=right | 4.1 km || 
|-id=070 bgcolor=#d6d6d6
| 233070 ||  || — || May 6, 2005 || Socorro || LINEAR || — || align=right | 5.7 km || 
|-id=071 bgcolor=#d6d6d6
| 233071 ||  || — || May 7, 2005 || Catalina || CSS || — || align=right | 4.5 km || 
|-id=072 bgcolor=#fefefe
| 233072 ||  || — || May 10, 2005 || Mount Lemmon || Mount Lemmon Survey || MAS || align=right data-sort-value="0.75" | 750 m || 
|-id=073 bgcolor=#d6d6d6
| 233073 ||  || — || May 12, 2005 || Palomar || NEAT || — || align=right | 5.2 km || 
|-id=074 bgcolor=#d6d6d6
| 233074 ||  || — || June 3, 2005 || Kitt Peak || Spacewatch || NAE || align=right | 4.9 km || 
|-id=075 bgcolor=#d6d6d6
| 233075 ||  || — || July 3, 2005 || Mount Lemmon || Mount Lemmon Survey || LIX || align=right | 6.2 km || 
|-id=076 bgcolor=#d6d6d6
| 233076 ||  || — || July 1, 2005 || Campo Imperatore || CINEOS || — || align=right | 7.4 km || 
|-id=077 bgcolor=#d6d6d6
| 233077 ||  || — || July 4, 2005 || Palomar || NEAT || — || align=right | 4.1 km || 
|-id=078 bgcolor=#fefefe
| 233078 ||  || — || July 13, 2005 || Mayhill || A. Lowe || — || align=right | 3.2 km || 
|-id=079 bgcolor=#fefefe
| 233079 ||  || — || July 9, 2005 || Kitt Peak || Spacewatch || NYS || align=right | 1.7 km || 
|-id=080 bgcolor=#FA8072
| 233080 ||  || — || August 2, 2005 || Socorro || LINEAR || — || align=right | 1.7 km || 
|-id=081 bgcolor=#fefefe
| 233081 ||  || — || August 25, 2005 || Palomar || NEAT || — || align=right | 1.0 km || 
|-id=082 bgcolor=#fefefe
| 233082 ||  || — || August 24, 2005 || Kingsnake || J. V. McClusky || — || align=right | 3.3 km || 
|-id=083 bgcolor=#fefefe
| 233083 ||  || — || August 24, 2005 || Palomar || NEAT || — || align=right | 1.0 km || 
|-id=084 bgcolor=#fefefe
| 233084 ||  || — || August 30, 2005 || Kitt Peak || Spacewatch || — || align=right | 1.1 km || 
|-id=085 bgcolor=#fefefe
| 233085 ||  || — || August 24, 2005 || Palomar || NEAT || — || align=right | 1.9 km || 
|-id=086 bgcolor=#fefefe
| 233086 ||  || — || August 27, 2005 || Palomar || NEAT || — || align=right | 1.1 km || 
|-id=087 bgcolor=#fefefe
| 233087 ||  || — || August 31, 2005 || Kitt Peak || Spacewatch || — || align=right data-sort-value="0.74" | 740 m || 
|-id=088 bgcolor=#fefefe
| 233088 ||  || — || September 1, 2005 || Kitt Peak || Spacewatch || — || align=right | 1.1 km || 
|-id=089 bgcolor=#fefefe
| 233089 ||  || — || September 1, 2005 || Kitt Peak || Spacewatch || NYS || align=right | 1.8 km || 
|-id=090 bgcolor=#fefefe
| 233090 ||  || — || September 8, 2005 || Socorro || LINEAR || FLO || align=right data-sort-value="0.84" | 840 m || 
|-id=091 bgcolor=#fefefe
| 233091 ||  || — || September 11, 2005 || Anderson Mesa || LONEOS || FLO || align=right data-sort-value="0.82" | 820 m || 
|-id=092 bgcolor=#fefefe
| 233092 ||  || — || September 10, 2005 || Anderson Mesa || LONEOS || — || align=right | 1.4 km || 
|-id=093 bgcolor=#E9E9E9
| 233093 ||  || — || September 13, 2005 || Anderson Mesa || LONEOS || — || align=right | 3.1 km || 
|-id=094 bgcolor=#fefefe
| 233094 ||  || — || September 14, 2005 || Kitt Peak || Spacewatch || — || align=right data-sort-value="0.98" | 980 m || 
|-id=095 bgcolor=#fefefe
| 233095 ||  || — || September 23, 2005 || Catalina || CSS || — || align=right | 1.0 km || 
|-id=096 bgcolor=#fefefe
| 233096 ||  || — || September 25, 2005 || Kitt Peak || Spacewatch || V || align=right data-sort-value="0.89" | 890 m || 
|-id=097 bgcolor=#fefefe
| 233097 ||  || — || September 24, 2005 || Anderson Mesa || LONEOS || FLO || align=right data-sort-value="0.90" | 900 m || 
|-id=098 bgcolor=#fefefe
| 233098 ||  || — || September 23, 2005 || Kitt Peak || Spacewatch || FLO || align=right data-sort-value="0.95" | 950 m || 
|-id=099 bgcolor=#fefefe
| 233099 ||  || — || September 24, 2005 || Kitt Peak || Spacewatch || — || align=right data-sort-value="0.80" | 800 m || 
|-id=100 bgcolor=#fefefe
| 233100 ||  || — || September 26, 2005 || Kitt Peak || Spacewatch || ERI || align=right | 1.6 km || 
|}

233101–233200 

|-bgcolor=#fefefe
| 233101 ||  || — || September 24, 2005 || Kitt Peak || Spacewatch || FLO || align=right data-sort-value="0.94" | 940 m || 
|-id=102 bgcolor=#fefefe
| 233102 ||  || — || September 24, 2005 || Kitt Peak || Spacewatch || FLO || align=right | 1.7 km || 
|-id=103 bgcolor=#fefefe
| 233103 ||  || — || September 24, 2005 || Kitt Peak || Spacewatch || — || align=right data-sort-value="0.96" | 960 m || 
|-id=104 bgcolor=#fefefe
| 233104 ||  || — || September 25, 2005 || Palomar || NEAT || PHO || align=right | 1.6 km || 
|-id=105 bgcolor=#fefefe
| 233105 ||  || — || September 25, 2005 || Palomar || NEAT || — || align=right | 2.6 km || 
|-id=106 bgcolor=#fefefe
| 233106 ||  || — || September 25, 2005 || Palomar || NEAT || — || align=right | 1.3 km || 
|-id=107 bgcolor=#fefefe
| 233107 ||  || — || September 27, 2005 || Kitt Peak || Spacewatch || — || align=right data-sort-value="0.75" | 750 m || 
|-id=108 bgcolor=#fefefe
| 233108 ||  || — || September 30, 2005 || Calvin-Rehoboth || L. A. Molnar || — || align=right data-sort-value="0.75" | 750 m || 
|-id=109 bgcolor=#fefefe
| 233109 ||  || — || September 24, 2005 || Kitt Peak || Spacewatch || — || align=right | 2.1 km || 
|-id=110 bgcolor=#fefefe
| 233110 ||  || — || September 26, 2005 || Palomar || NEAT || NYS || align=right data-sort-value="0.79" | 790 m || 
|-id=111 bgcolor=#fefefe
| 233111 ||  || — || September 27, 2005 || Socorro || LINEAR || ERI || align=right | 1.8 km || 
|-id=112 bgcolor=#fefefe
| 233112 ||  || — || September 28, 2005 || Palomar || NEAT || — || align=right data-sort-value="0.89" | 890 m || 
|-id=113 bgcolor=#fefefe
| 233113 ||  || — || September 30, 2005 || Palomar || NEAT || — || align=right | 1.4 km || 
|-id=114 bgcolor=#fefefe
| 233114 ||  || — || September 30, 2005 || Catalina || CSS || PHO || align=right | 2.1 km || 
|-id=115 bgcolor=#fefefe
| 233115 ||  || — || September 30, 2005 || Kitt Peak || Spacewatch || — || align=right data-sort-value="0.73" | 730 m || 
|-id=116 bgcolor=#fefefe
| 233116 ||  || — || September 30, 2005 || Mount Lemmon || Mount Lemmon Survey || MAS || align=right data-sort-value="0.82" | 820 m || 
|-id=117 bgcolor=#fefefe
| 233117 ||  || — || September 18, 2005 || Palomar || NEAT || ERI || align=right | 2.6 km || 
|-id=118 bgcolor=#fefefe
| 233118 ||  || — || October 1, 2005 || Kitt Peak || Spacewatch || NYS || align=right | 1.9 km || 
|-id=119 bgcolor=#fefefe
| 233119 ||  || — || October 1, 2005 || Kitt Peak || Spacewatch || — || align=right data-sort-value="0.87" | 870 m || 
|-id=120 bgcolor=#fefefe
| 233120 ||  || — || October 1, 2005 || Mount Lemmon || Mount Lemmon Survey || EUT || align=right data-sort-value="0.96" | 960 m || 
|-id=121 bgcolor=#fefefe
| 233121 ||  || — || October 1, 2005 || Kitt Peak || Spacewatch || — || align=right data-sort-value="0.95" | 950 m || 
|-id=122 bgcolor=#fefefe
| 233122 ||  || — || October 2, 2005 || Mount Lemmon || Mount Lemmon Survey || FLOfast? || align=right data-sort-value="0.80" | 800 m || 
|-id=123 bgcolor=#fefefe
| 233123 ||  || — || October 2, 2005 || Mount Lemmon || Mount Lemmon Survey || FLO || align=right data-sort-value="0.77" | 770 m || 
|-id=124 bgcolor=#fefefe
| 233124 ||  || — || October 3, 2005 || Socorro || LINEAR || FLO || align=right data-sort-value="0.87" | 870 m || 
|-id=125 bgcolor=#fefefe
| 233125 ||  || — || October 3, 2005 || Palomar || NEAT || — || align=right | 1.2 km || 
|-id=126 bgcolor=#fefefe
| 233126 ||  || — || October 8, 2005 || Socorro || LINEAR || — || align=right data-sort-value="0.99" | 990 m || 
|-id=127 bgcolor=#fefefe
| 233127 ||  || — || October 7, 2005 || Kitt Peak || Spacewatch || — || align=right data-sort-value="0.75" | 750 m || 
|-id=128 bgcolor=#fefefe
| 233128 ||  || — || October 8, 2005 || Kitt Peak || Spacewatch || ERI || align=right | 2.7 km || 
|-id=129 bgcolor=#fefefe
| 233129 ||  || — || October 22, 2005 || Kitt Peak || Spacewatch || — || align=right | 2.2 km || 
|-id=130 bgcolor=#fefefe
| 233130 ||  || — || October 24, 2005 || Kitt Peak || Spacewatch || NYS || align=right data-sort-value="0.85" | 850 m || 
|-id=131 bgcolor=#E9E9E9
| 233131 ||  || — || October 25, 2005 || Catalina || CSS || BAR || align=right | 2.0 km || 
|-id=132 bgcolor=#fefefe
| 233132 ||  || — || October 23, 2005 || Catalina || CSS || — || align=right | 1.0 km || 
|-id=133 bgcolor=#fefefe
| 233133 ||  || — || October 24, 2005 || Kitt Peak || Spacewatch || — || align=right | 1.2 km || 
|-id=134 bgcolor=#fefefe
| 233134 ||  || — || October 24, 2005 || Palomar || NEAT || — || align=right | 1.1 km || 
|-id=135 bgcolor=#fefefe
| 233135 ||  || — || October 22, 2005 || Kitt Peak || Spacewatch || NYS || align=right data-sort-value="0.72" | 720 m || 
|-id=136 bgcolor=#fefefe
| 233136 ||  || — || October 22, 2005 || Kitt Peak || Spacewatch || NYS || align=right | 1.7 km || 
|-id=137 bgcolor=#fefefe
| 233137 ||  || — || October 22, 2005 || Kitt Peak || Spacewatch || — || align=right | 1.2 km || 
|-id=138 bgcolor=#fefefe
| 233138 ||  || — || October 22, 2005 || Kitt Peak || Spacewatch || — || align=right | 1.0 km || 
|-id=139 bgcolor=#fefefe
| 233139 ||  || — || October 22, 2005 || Kitt Peak || Spacewatch || FLO || align=right data-sort-value="0.86" | 860 m || 
|-id=140 bgcolor=#fefefe
| 233140 ||  || — || October 24, 2005 || Palomar || NEAT || FLO || align=right data-sort-value="0.99" | 990 m || 
|-id=141 bgcolor=#fefefe
| 233141 ||  || — || October 24, 2005 || Palomar || NEAT || — || align=right | 1.8 km || 
|-id=142 bgcolor=#E9E9E9
| 233142 ||  || — || October 24, 2005 || Palomar || NEAT || — || align=right | 3.3 km || 
|-id=143 bgcolor=#fefefe
| 233143 ||  || — || October 23, 2005 || Catalina || CSS || MAS || align=right data-sort-value="0.99" | 990 m || 
|-id=144 bgcolor=#fefefe
| 233144 ||  || — || October 24, 2005 || Kitt Peak || Spacewatch || — || align=right data-sort-value="0.72" | 720 m || 
|-id=145 bgcolor=#fefefe
| 233145 ||  || — || October 24, 2005 || Kitt Peak || Spacewatch || FLO || align=right data-sort-value="0.82" | 820 m || 
|-id=146 bgcolor=#fefefe
| 233146 ||  || — || October 24, 2005 || Kitt Peak || Spacewatch || NYS || align=right data-sort-value="0.64" | 640 m || 
|-id=147 bgcolor=#fefefe
| 233147 ||  || — || October 23, 2005 || Palomar || NEAT || ERI || align=right | 2.6 km || 
|-id=148 bgcolor=#fefefe
| 233148 ||  || — || October 26, 2005 || Palomar || NEAT || — || align=right | 1.2 km || 
|-id=149 bgcolor=#fefefe
| 233149 ||  || — || October 25, 2005 || Kitt Peak || Spacewatch || NYS || align=right data-sort-value="0.81" | 810 m || 
|-id=150 bgcolor=#E9E9E9
| 233150 ||  || — || October 25, 2005 || Catalina || CSS || — || align=right | 2.7 km || 
|-id=151 bgcolor=#E9E9E9
| 233151 ||  || — || October 25, 2005 || Kitt Peak || Spacewatch || — || align=right | 1.7 km || 
|-id=152 bgcolor=#fefefe
| 233152 ||  || — || October 25, 2005 || Kitt Peak || Spacewatch || — || align=right | 1.1 km || 
|-id=153 bgcolor=#fefefe
| 233153 ||  || — || October 25, 2005 || Kitt Peak || Spacewatch || — || align=right data-sort-value="0.87" | 870 m || 
|-id=154 bgcolor=#fefefe
| 233154 ||  || — || October 27, 2005 || Kitt Peak || Spacewatch || — || align=right data-sort-value="0.97" | 970 m || 
|-id=155 bgcolor=#fefefe
| 233155 ||  || — || October 29, 2005 || Catalina || CSS || NYS || align=right | 2.4 km || 
|-id=156 bgcolor=#fefefe
| 233156 ||  || — || October 29, 2005 || Catalina || CSS || — || align=right | 1.4 km || 
|-id=157 bgcolor=#fefefe
| 233157 ||  || — || October 27, 2005 || Kitt Peak || Spacewatch || NYS || align=right | 1.5 km || 
|-id=158 bgcolor=#fefefe
| 233158 ||  || — || October 29, 2005 || Mount Lemmon || Mount Lemmon Survey || — || align=right data-sort-value="0.74" | 740 m || 
|-id=159 bgcolor=#fefefe
| 233159 ||  || — || October 30, 2005 || Mount Lemmon || Mount Lemmon Survey || — || align=right data-sort-value="0.98" | 980 m || 
|-id=160 bgcolor=#fefefe
| 233160 ||  || — || October 28, 2005 || Kitt Peak || Spacewatch || — || align=right | 1.6 km || 
|-id=161 bgcolor=#E9E9E9
| 233161 ||  || — || October 29, 2005 || Palomar || NEAT || — || align=right | 3.3 km || 
|-id=162 bgcolor=#fefefe
| 233162 ||  || — || October 30, 2005 || Socorro || LINEAR || FLO || align=right data-sort-value="0.95" | 950 m || 
|-id=163 bgcolor=#fefefe
| 233163 ||  || — || October 30, 2005 || Socorro || LINEAR || FLO || align=right data-sort-value="0.93" | 930 m || 
|-id=164 bgcolor=#fefefe
| 233164 ||  || — || October 22, 2005 || Kitt Peak || Spacewatch || NYS || align=right data-sort-value="0.72" | 720 m || 
|-id=165 bgcolor=#fefefe
| 233165 ||  || — || October 26, 2005 || Kitt Peak || Spacewatch || V || align=right data-sort-value="0.96" | 960 m || 
|-id=166 bgcolor=#E9E9E9
| 233166 ||  || — || October 24, 2005 || Mauna Kea || D. J. Tholen || — || align=right | 1.5 km || 
|-id=167 bgcolor=#fefefe
| 233167 ||  || — || October 30, 2005 || Mount Lemmon || Mount Lemmon Survey || NYS || align=right data-sort-value="0.71" | 710 m || 
|-id=168 bgcolor=#fefefe
| 233168 ||  || — || November 6, 2005 || Mayhill || A. Lowe || — || align=right | 1.1 km || 
|-id=169 bgcolor=#fefefe
| 233169 ||  || — || November 1, 2005 || Socorro || LINEAR || FLO || align=right data-sort-value="0.84" | 840 m || 
|-id=170 bgcolor=#fefefe
| 233170 ||  || — || November 3, 2005 || Catalina || CSS || — || align=right data-sort-value="0.91" | 910 m || 
|-id=171 bgcolor=#fefefe
| 233171 ||  || — || November 1, 2005 || Kitt Peak || Spacewatch || V || align=right data-sort-value="0.78" | 780 m || 
|-id=172 bgcolor=#fefefe
| 233172 ||  || — || November 1, 2005 || Kitt Peak || Spacewatch || — || align=right data-sort-value="0.73" | 730 m || 
|-id=173 bgcolor=#fefefe
| 233173 ||  || — || November 4, 2005 || Mount Lemmon || Mount Lemmon Survey || — || align=right | 1.2 km || 
|-id=174 bgcolor=#fefefe
| 233174 ||  || — || November 1, 2005 || Mount Lemmon || Mount Lemmon Survey || — || align=right | 1.2 km || 
|-id=175 bgcolor=#E9E9E9
| 233175 ||  || — || November 6, 2005 || Kitt Peak || Spacewatch || — || align=right | 1.9 km || 
|-id=176 bgcolor=#E9E9E9
| 233176 ||  || — || November 4, 2005 || Kitt Peak || Spacewatch || HNS || align=right | 2.1 km || 
|-id=177 bgcolor=#fefefe
| 233177 ||  || — || November 1, 2005 || Mount Lemmon || Mount Lemmon Survey || NYS || align=right data-sort-value="0.60" | 600 m || 
|-id=178 bgcolor=#E9E9E9
| 233178 ||  || — || November 12, 2005 || Kitt Peak || Spacewatch || JUN || align=right | 1.4 km || 
|-id=179 bgcolor=#fefefe
| 233179 ||  || — || November 21, 2005 || Kitt Peak || Spacewatch || NYS || align=right data-sort-value="0.71" | 710 m || 
|-id=180 bgcolor=#fefefe
| 233180 ||  || — || November 21, 2005 || Kitt Peak || Spacewatch || — || align=right | 1.6 km || 
|-id=181 bgcolor=#fefefe
| 233181 ||  || — || November 21, 2005 || Kitt Peak || Spacewatch || — || align=right | 1.9 km || 
|-id=182 bgcolor=#fefefe
| 233182 ||  || — || November 21, 2005 || Kitt Peak || Spacewatch || FLO || align=right data-sort-value="0.90" | 900 m || 
|-id=183 bgcolor=#fefefe
| 233183 ||  || — || November 28, 2005 || Socorro || LINEAR || — || align=right | 1.4 km || 
|-id=184 bgcolor=#fefefe
| 233184 ||  || — || November 25, 2005 || Kitt Peak || Spacewatch || NYS || align=right data-sort-value="0.70" | 700 m || 
|-id=185 bgcolor=#E9E9E9
| 233185 ||  || — || November 25, 2005 || Catalina || CSS || — || align=right | 3.5 km || 
|-id=186 bgcolor=#fefefe
| 233186 ||  || — || November 26, 2005 || Mount Lemmon || Mount Lemmon Survey || — || align=right | 1.1 km || 
|-id=187 bgcolor=#fefefe
| 233187 ||  || — || November 25, 2005 || Kitt Peak || Spacewatch || NYS || align=right data-sort-value="0.76" | 760 m || 
|-id=188 bgcolor=#fefefe
| 233188 ||  || — || November 26, 2005 || Kitt Peak || Spacewatch || V || align=right | 1.0 km || 
|-id=189 bgcolor=#E9E9E9
| 233189 ||  || — || November 29, 2005 || Socorro || LINEAR || MIT || align=right | 4.9 km || 
|-id=190 bgcolor=#E9E9E9
| 233190 ||  || — || November 30, 2005 || Mount Lemmon || Mount Lemmon Survey || EUN || align=right | 1.7 km || 
|-id=191 bgcolor=#fefefe
| 233191 ||  || — || November 26, 2005 || Mount Lemmon || Mount Lemmon Survey || — || align=right data-sort-value="0.57" | 570 m || 
|-id=192 bgcolor=#fefefe
| 233192 ||  || — || November 28, 2005 || Kitt Peak || Spacewatch || NYS || align=right | 1.9 km || 
|-id=193 bgcolor=#fefefe
| 233193 ||  || — || November 28, 2005 || Catalina || CSS || NYS || align=right data-sort-value="0.88" | 880 m || 
|-id=194 bgcolor=#fefefe
| 233194 ||  || — || November 30, 2005 || Kitt Peak || Spacewatch || MAS || align=right data-sort-value="0.88" | 880 m || 
|-id=195 bgcolor=#fefefe
| 233195 ||  || — || November 29, 2005 || Mount Lemmon || Mount Lemmon Survey || FLO || align=right data-sort-value="0.65" | 650 m || 
|-id=196 bgcolor=#fefefe
| 233196 ||  || — || November 30, 2005 || Kitt Peak || Spacewatch || FLO || align=right | 1.4 km || 
|-id=197 bgcolor=#fefefe
| 233197 ||  || — || November 30, 2005 || Kitt Peak || Spacewatch || — || align=right | 1.2 km || 
|-id=198 bgcolor=#E9E9E9
| 233198 ||  || — || November 28, 2005 || Palomar || NEAT || — || align=right | 1.6 km || 
|-id=199 bgcolor=#fefefe
| 233199 ||  || — || November 29, 2005 || Mount Lemmon || Mount Lemmon Survey || MAS || align=right | 1.3 km || 
|-id=200 bgcolor=#E9E9E9
| 233200 ||  || — || November 20, 2005 || Catalina || CSS || — || align=right | 3.3 km || 
|}

233201–233300 

|-bgcolor=#fefefe
| 233201 ||  || — || November 21, 2005 || Kitt Peak || Spacewatch || NYS || align=right data-sort-value="0.84" | 840 m || 
|-id=202 bgcolor=#fefefe
| 233202 ||  || — || November 25, 2005 || Kitt Peak || Spacewatch || — || align=right data-sort-value="0.95" | 950 m || 
|-id=203 bgcolor=#fefefe
| 233203 ||  || — || December 1, 2005 || Socorro || LINEAR || — || align=right | 1.6 km || 
|-id=204 bgcolor=#fefefe
| 233204 ||  || — || December 1, 2005 || Kitt Peak || Spacewatch || — || align=right | 1.1 km || 
|-id=205 bgcolor=#fefefe
| 233205 ||  || — || December 2, 2005 || Mount Lemmon || Mount Lemmon Survey || NYS || align=right data-sort-value="0.72" | 720 m || 
|-id=206 bgcolor=#fefefe
| 233206 ||  || — || December 5, 2005 || Junk Bond || D. Healy || — || align=right data-sort-value="0.78" | 780 m || 
|-id=207 bgcolor=#fefefe
| 233207 ||  || — || December 1, 2005 || Mount Lemmon || Mount Lemmon Survey || NYS || align=right data-sort-value="0.99" | 990 m || 
|-id=208 bgcolor=#E9E9E9
| 233208 ||  || — || December 4, 2005 || Kitt Peak || Spacewatch || — || align=right | 2.2 km || 
|-id=209 bgcolor=#fefefe
| 233209 ||  || — || December 5, 2005 || Kitt Peak || Spacewatch || — || align=right | 1.4 km || 
|-id=210 bgcolor=#fefefe
| 233210 ||  || — || December 5, 2005 || Socorro || LINEAR || — || align=right | 1.0 km || 
|-id=211 bgcolor=#E9E9E9
| 233211 ||  || — || December 7, 2005 || Kitt Peak || Spacewatch || — || align=right | 2.3 km || 
|-id=212 bgcolor=#fefefe
| 233212 ||  || — || December 7, 2005 || Kitt Peak || Spacewatch || — || align=right | 1.0 km || 
|-id=213 bgcolor=#fefefe
| 233213 ||  || — || December 6, 2005 || Kitt Peak || Spacewatch || FLO || align=right data-sort-value="0.83" | 830 m || 
|-id=214 bgcolor=#E9E9E9
| 233214 ||  || — || December 1, 2005 || Kitt Peak || M. W. Buie || — || align=right | 1.7 km || 
|-id=215 bgcolor=#E9E9E9
| 233215 ||  || — || December 10, 2005 || Kitt Peak || Spacewatch || — || align=right | 2.9 km || 
|-id=216 bgcolor=#E9E9E9
| 233216 ||  || — || December 2, 2005 || Mount Lemmon || Mount Lemmon Survey || — || align=right | 1.5 km || 
|-id=217 bgcolor=#fefefe
| 233217 || 2005 YM || — || December 20, 2005 || Calvin-Rehoboth || Calvin–Rehoboth Obs. || — || align=right | 1.0 km || 
|-id=218 bgcolor=#fefefe
| 233218 ||  || — || December 21, 2005 || Kitt Peak || Spacewatch || — || align=right | 1.2 km || 
|-id=219 bgcolor=#fefefe
| 233219 ||  || — || December 21, 2005 || Kitt Peak || Spacewatch || NYS || align=right | 1.0 km || 
|-id=220 bgcolor=#fefefe
| 233220 ||  || — || December 21, 2005 || Kitt Peak || Spacewatch || NYS || align=right data-sort-value="0.93" | 930 m || 
|-id=221 bgcolor=#fefefe
| 233221 ||  || — || December 22, 2005 || Kitt Peak || Spacewatch || MAS || align=right | 1.1 km || 
|-id=222 bgcolor=#E9E9E9
| 233222 ||  || — || December 22, 2005 || Kitt Peak || Spacewatch || — || align=right | 1.1 km || 
|-id=223 bgcolor=#E9E9E9
| 233223 ||  || — || December 21, 2005 || Catalina || CSS || HNS || align=right | 2.6 km || 
|-id=224 bgcolor=#fefefe
| 233224 ||  || — || December 21, 2005 || Catalina || CSS || — || align=right | 1.00 km || 
|-id=225 bgcolor=#fefefe
| 233225 ||  || — || December 22, 2005 || Kitt Peak || Spacewatch || — || align=right | 1.1 km || 
|-id=226 bgcolor=#E9E9E9
| 233226 ||  || — || December 24, 2005 || Kitt Peak || Spacewatch || — || align=right | 3.5 km || 
|-id=227 bgcolor=#fefefe
| 233227 ||  || — || December 21, 2005 || Catalina || CSS || — || align=right | 2.1 km || 
|-id=228 bgcolor=#fefefe
| 233228 ||  || — || December 22, 2005 || Cordell-Lorenz || Cordell–Lorenz Obs. || MAS || align=right | 1.0 km || 
|-id=229 bgcolor=#fefefe
| 233229 ||  || — || December 22, 2005 || Catalina || CSS || — || align=right | 1.6 km || 
|-id=230 bgcolor=#fefefe
| 233230 ||  || — || December 25, 2005 || Kitt Peak || Spacewatch || — || align=right | 1.1 km || 
|-id=231 bgcolor=#fefefe
| 233231 ||  || — || December 25, 2005 || Kitt Peak || Spacewatch || — || align=right | 1.2 km || 
|-id=232 bgcolor=#fefefe
| 233232 ||  || — || December 25, 2005 || Kitt Peak || Spacewatch || NYS || align=right | 1.0 km || 
|-id=233 bgcolor=#fefefe
| 233233 ||  || — || December 22, 2005 || Kitt Peak || Spacewatch || NYS || align=right | 1.0 km || 
|-id=234 bgcolor=#E9E9E9
| 233234 ||  || — || December 26, 2005 || Mount Lemmon || Mount Lemmon Survey || — || align=right | 2.9 km || 
|-id=235 bgcolor=#E9E9E9
| 233235 ||  || — || December 25, 2005 || Kitt Peak || Spacewatch || MRX || align=right | 1.5 km || 
|-id=236 bgcolor=#fefefe
| 233236 ||  || — || December 24, 2005 || Kitt Peak || Spacewatch || MAS || align=right | 1.2 km || 
|-id=237 bgcolor=#fefefe
| 233237 ||  || — || December 26, 2005 || Kitt Peak || Spacewatch || — || align=right | 1.4 km || 
|-id=238 bgcolor=#fefefe
| 233238 ||  || — || December 24, 2005 || Kitt Peak || Spacewatch || V || align=right data-sort-value="0.92" | 920 m || 
|-id=239 bgcolor=#fefefe
| 233239 ||  || — || December 24, 2005 || Kitt Peak || Spacewatch || — || align=right data-sort-value="0.98" | 980 m || 
|-id=240 bgcolor=#fefefe
| 233240 ||  || — || December 24, 2005 || Kitt Peak || Spacewatch || NYS || align=right data-sort-value="0.92" | 920 m || 
|-id=241 bgcolor=#fefefe
| 233241 ||  || — || December 24, 2005 || Kitt Peak || Spacewatch || NYS || align=right | 1.0 km || 
|-id=242 bgcolor=#fefefe
| 233242 ||  || — || December 25, 2005 || Mount Lemmon || Mount Lemmon Survey || — || align=right | 1.0 km || 
|-id=243 bgcolor=#fefefe
| 233243 ||  || — || December 27, 2005 || Mount Lemmon || Mount Lemmon Survey || NYS || align=right | 1.2 km || 
|-id=244 bgcolor=#fefefe
| 233244 ||  || — || December 25, 2005 || Kitt Peak || Spacewatch || ERI || align=right | 3.2 km || 
|-id=245 bgcolor=#fefefe
| 233245 ||  || — || December 25, 2005 || Kitt Peak || Spacewatch || NYS || align=right data-sort-value="0.88" | 880 m || 
|-id=246 bgcolor=#fefefe
| 233246 ||  || — || December 25, 2005 || Mount Lemmon || Mount Lemmon Survey || MAS || align=right data-sort-value="0.98" | 980 m || 
|-id=247 bgcolor=#E9E9E9
| 233247 ||  || — || December 25, 2005 || Kitt Peak || Spacewatch || — || align=right | 3.3 km || 
|-id=248 bgcolor=#E9E9E9
| 233248 ||  || — || December 25, 2005 || Kitt Peak || Spacewatch || MIS || align=right | 2.1 km || 
|-id=249 bgcolor=#fefefe
| 233249 ||  || — || December 26, 2005 || Kitt Peak || Spacewatch || NYS || align=right data-sort-value="0.79" | 790 m || 
|-id=250 bgcolor=#fefefe
| 233250 ||  || — || December 27, 2005 || Mount Lemmon || Mount Lemmon Survey || — || align=right | 1.0 km || 
|-id=251 bgcolor=#fefefe
| 233251 ||  || — || December 24, 2005 || Kitt Peak || Spacewatch || — || align=right | 1.2 km || 
|-id=252 bgcolor=#E9E9E9
| 233252 ||  || — || December 24, 2005 || Kitt Peak || Spacewatch || EUN || align=right | 1.8 km || 
|-id=253 bgcolor=#fefefe
| 233253 ||  || — || December 26, 2005 || Kitt Peak || Spacewatch || — || align=right | 1.1 km || 
|-id=254 bgcolor=#fefefe
| 233254 ||  || — || December 28, 2005 || Kitt Peak || Spacewatch || NYS || align=right data-sort-value="0.71" | 710 m || 
|-id=255 bgcolor=#fefefe
| 233255 ||  || — || December 28, 2005 || Mount Lemmon || Mount Lemmon Survey || NYS || align=right data-sort-value="0.96" | 960 m || 
|-id=256 bgcolor=#E9E9E9
| 233256 ||  || — || December 26, 2005 || Mount Lemmon || Mount Lemmon Survey || — || align=right | 2.0 km || 
|-id=257 bgcolor=#d6d6d6
| 233257 ||  || — || December 25, 2005 || Kitt Peak || Spacewatch || EOS || align=right | 3.2 km || 
|-id=258 bgcolor=#E9E9E9
| 233258 ||  || — || December 27, 2005 || Kitt Peak || Spacewatch || ADE || align=right | 3.8 km || 
|-id=259 bgcolor=#fefefe
| 233259 ||  || — || December 28, 2005 || Kitt Peak || Spacewatch || NYS || align=right data-sort-value="0.79" | 790 m || 
|-id=260 bgcolor=#fefefe
| 233260 ||  || — || December 27, 2005 || Kitt Peak || Spacewatch || NYS || align=right | 2.4 km || 
|-id=261 bgcolor=#E9E9E9
| 233261 ||  || — || December 30, 2005 || Kitt Peak || Spacewatch || — || align=right | 2.9 km || 
|-id=262 bgcolor=#fefefe
| 233262 ||  || — || December 30, 2005 || Kitt Peak || Spacewatch || MAS || align=right data-sort-value="0.86" | 860 m || 
|-id=263 bgcolor=#fefefe
| 233263 ||  || — || December 30, 2005 || Kitt Peak || Spacewatch || MAS || align=right | 1.2 km || 
|-id=264 bgcolor=#E9E9E9
| 233264 ||  || — || December 27, 2005 || Kitt Peak || Spacewatch || EUN || align=right | 2.0 km || 
|-id=265 bgcolor=#fefefe
| 233265 ||  || — || December 24, 2005 || Catalina || CSS || — || align=right | 1.7 km || 
|-id=266 bgcolor=#fefefe
| 233266 ||  || — || December 24, 2005 || Socorro || LINEAR || — || align=right | 1.5 km || 
|-id=267 bgcolor=#E9E9E9
| 233267 ||  || — || December 25, 2005 || Catalina || CSS || HNS || align=right | 1.9 km || 
|-id=268 bgcolor=#E9E9E9
| 233268 ||  || — || December 29, 2005 || Catalina || CSS || — || align=right | 2.6 km || 
|-id=269 bgcolor=#fefefe
| 233269 ||  || — || December 29, 2005 || Kitt Peak || Spacewatch || — || align=right | 1.3 km || 
|-id=270 bgcolor=#fefefe
| 233270 ||  || — || December 27, 2005 || Kitt Peak || Spacewatch || — || align=right | 1.2 km || 
|-id=271 bgcolor=#E9E9E9
| 233271 ||  || — || January 2, 2006 || Catalina || CSS || — || align=right | 2.5 km || 
|-id=272 bgcolor=#fefefe
| 233272 ||  || — || January 4, 2006 || Mount Lemmon || Mount Lemmon Survey || — || align=right | 1.3 km || 
|-id=273 bgcolor=#fefefe
| 233273 ||  || — || January 4, 2006 || Catalina || CSS || — || align=right | 3.8 km || 
|-id=274 bgcolor=#E9E9E9
| 233274 ||  || — || January 4, 2006 || Mount Lemmon || Mount Lemmon Survey || — || align=right | 2.2 km || 
|-id=275 bgcolor=#fefefe
| 233275 ||  || — || January 4, 2006 || Kitt Peak || Spacewatch || MAS || align=right | 1.1 km || 
|-id=276 bgcolor=#fefefe
| 233276 ||  || — || January 6, 2006 || Kitt Peak || Spacewatch || NYS || align=right data-sort-value="0.81" | 810 m || 
|-id=277 bgcolor=#fefefe
| 233277 ||  || — || January 7, 2006 || Socorro || LINEAR || — || align=right | 1.5 km || 
|-id=278 bgcolor=#fefefe
| 233278 ||  || — || January 5, 2006 || Kitt Peak || Spacewatch || V || align=right data-sort-value="0.77" | 770 m || 
|-id=279 bgcolor=#E9E9E9
| 233279 ||  || — || January 8, 2006 || Mount Lemmon || Mount Lemmon Survey || EUN || align=right | 1.9 km || 
|-id=280 bgcolor=#fefefe
| 233280 ||  || — || January 5, 2006 || Kitt Peak || Spacewatch || — || align=right data-sort-value="0.91" | 910 m || 
|-id=281 bgcolor=#fefefe
| 233281 ||  || — || January 6, 2006 || Mount Lemmon || Mount Lemmon Survey || — || align=right | 1.2 km || 
|-id=282 bgcolor=#E9E9E9
| 233282 ||  || — || January 5, 2006 || Anderson Mesa || LONEOS || JUN || align=right | 1.4 km || 
|-id=283 bgcolor=#fefefe
| 233283 ||  || — || January 7, 2006 || Anderson Mesa || LONEOS || — || align=right | 3.4 km || 
|-id=284 bgcolor=#E9E9E9
| 233284 ||  || — || January 5, 2006 || Mount Lemmon || Mount Lemmon Survey || MIS || align=right | 2.5 km || 
|-id=285 bgcolor=#d6d6d6
| 233285 ||  || — || January 6, 2006 || Kitt Peak || Spacewatch || TEL || align=right | 2.4 km || 
|-id=286 bgcolor=#fefefe
| 233286 ||  || — || January 7, 2006 || Mount Lemmon || Mount Lemmon Survey || — || align=right | 1.4 km || 
|-id=287 bgcolor=#E9E9E9
| 233287 ||  || — || January 7, 2006 || Mount Lemmon || Mount Lemmon Survey || MAR || align=right | 1.8 km || 
|-id=288 bgcolor=#E9E9E9
| 233288 ||  || — || January 7, 2006 || Mount Lemmon || Mount Lemmon Survey || MAR || align=right | 1.8 km || 
|-id=289 bgcolor=#E9E9E9
| 233289 ||  || — || January 6, 2006 || Anderson Mesa || LONEOS || GEF || align=right | 1.9 km || 
|-id=290 bgcolor=#E9E9E9
| 233290 ||  || — || January 6, 2006 || Catalina || CSS || — || align=right | 1.5 km || 
|-id=291 bgcolor=#E9E9E9
| 233291 ||  || — || January 6, 2006 || Anderson Mesa || LONEOS || — || align=right | 1.8 km || 
|-id=292 bgcolor=#E9E9E9
| 233292 Brianschmidt || 2006 BV ||  || January 19, 2006 || Vallemare di Borbona || V. S. Casulli || — || align=right | 1.1 km || 
|-id=293 bgcolor=#fefefe
| 233293 ||  || — || January 20, 2006 || Kitt Peak || Spacewatch || — || align=right | 1.1 km || 
|-id=294 bgcolor=#E9E9E9
| 233294 ||  || — || January 20, 2006 || Kitt Peak || Spacewatch || — || align=right | 1.5 km || 
|-id=295 bgcolor=#E9E9E9
| 233295 ||  || — || January 20, 2006 || Kitt Peak || Spacewatch || — || align=right | 1.0 km || 
|-id=296 bgcolor=#E9E9E9
| 233296 ||  || — || January 20, 2006 || Kitt Peak || Spacewatch || — || align=right data-sort-value="0.91" | 910 m || 
|-id=297 bgcolor=#fefefe
| 233297 ||  || — || January 22, 2006 || Mount Lemmon || Mount Lemmon Survey || NYS || align=right data-sort-value="0.94" | 940 m || 
|-id=298 bgcolor=#fefefe
| 233298 ||  || — || January 23, 2006 || Mount Lemmon || Mount Lemmon Survey || MAS || align=right data-sort-value="0.99" | 990 m || 
|-id=299 bgcolor=#E9E9E9
| 233299 ||  || — || January 23, 2006 || Mount Lemmon || Mount Lemmon Survey || — || align=right | 3.2 km || 
|-id=300 bgcolor=#fefefe
| 233300 ||  || — || January 23, 2006 || Nyukasa || Mount Nyukasa Stn. || — || align=right data-sort-value="0.96" | 960 m || 
|}

233301–233400 

|-bgcolor=#E9E9E9
| 233301 ||  || — || January 19, 2006 || Catalina || CSS || — || align=right | 2.7 km || 
|-id=302 bgcolor=#d6d6d6
| 233302 ||  || — || January 23, 2006 || Mount Lemmon || Mount Lemmon Survey || — || align=right | 2.6 km || 
|-id=303 bgcolor=#E9E9E9
| 233303 ||  || — || January 23, 2006 || Mount Lemmon || Mount Lemmon Survey || — || align=right | 1.3 km || 
|-id=304 bgcolor=#E9E9E9
| 233304 ||  || — || January 22, 2006 || Mount Lemmon || Mount Lemmon Survey || AGN || align=right | 1.7 km || 
|-id=305 bgcolor=#E9E9E9
| 233305 ||  || — || January 23, 2006 || Kitt Peak || Spacewatch || — || align=right | 3.8 km || 
|-id=306 bgcolor=#E9E9E9
| 233306 ||  || — || January 23, 2006 || Kitt Peak || Spacewatch || — || align=right | 3.5 km || 
|-id=307 bgcolor=#E9E9E9
| 233307 ||  || — || January 23, 2006 || Kitt Peak || Spacewatch || — || align=right | 1.2 km || 
|-id=308 bgcolor=#E9E9E9
| 233308 ||  || — || January 23, 2006 || Catalina || CSS || — || align=right | 1.8 km || 
|-id=309 bgcolor=#E9E9E9
| 233309 ||  || — || January 23, 2006 || Kitt Peak || Spacewatch || — || align=right | 1.7 km || 
|-id=310 bgcolor=#fefefe
| 233310 ||  || — || January 25, 2006 || Kitt Peak || Spacewatch || NYS || align=right | 1.1 km || 
|-id=311 bgcolor=#fefefe
| 233311 ||  || — || January 26, 2006 || Kitt Peak || Spacewatch || V || align=right | 1.0 km || 
|-id=312 bgcolor=#E9E9E9
| 233312 ||  || — || January 26, 2006 || Mount Lemmon || Mount Lemmon Survey || AGN || align=right | 1.7 km || 
|-id=313 bgcolor=#E9E9E9
| 233313 ||  || — || January 26, 2006 || Mount Lemmon || Mount Lemmon Survey || HEN || align=right | 1.0 km || 
|-id=314 bgcolor=#E9E9E9
| 233314 ||  || — || January 26, 2006 || Kitt Peak || Spacewatch || HEN || align=right | 1.2 km || 
|-id=315 bgcolor=#E9E9E9
| 233315 ||  || — || January 26, 2006 || Kitt Peak || Spacewatch || — || align=right | 1.5 km || 
|-id=316 bgcolor=#E9E9E9
| 233316 ||  || — || January 27, 2006 || Mount Lemmon || Mount Lemmon Survey || — || align=right | 1.4 km || 
|-id=317 bgcolor=#E9E9E9
| 233317 ||  || — || January 23, 2006 || Catalina || CSS || ADE || align=right | 4.0 km || 
|-id=318 bgcolor=#E9E9E9
| 233318 ||  || — || January 26, 2006 || Mount Lemmon || Mount Lemmon Survey || — || align=right | 1.7 km || 
|-id=319 bgcolor=#E9E9E9
| 233319 ||  || — || January 26, 2006 || Mount Lemmon || Mount Lemmon Survey || WIT || align=right | 1.3 km || 
|-id=320 bgcolor=#E9E9E9
| 233320 ||  || — || January 27, 2006 || Mount Lemmon || Mount Lemmon Survey || — || align=right data-sort-value="0.96" | 960 m || 
|-id=321 bgcolor=#fefefe
| 233321 ||  || — || January 30, 2006 || Kitt Peak || Spacewatch || ERI || align=right | 2.7 km || 
|-id=322 bgcolor=#E9E9E9
| 233322 ||  || — || January 30, 2006 || Kitt Peak || Spacewatch || — || align=right | 1.1 km || 
|-id=323 bgcolor=#E9E9E9
| 233323 ||  || — || January 31, 2006 || Kitt Peak || Spacewatch || RAF || align=right | 1.2 km || 
|-id=324 bgcolor=#E9E9E9
| 233324 ||  || — || January 28, 2006 || Catalina || CSS || — || align=right | 3.0 km || 
|-id=325 bgcolor=#fefefe
| 233325 ||  || — || January 30, 2006 || Kitt Peak || Spacewatch || NYS || align=right | 1.1 km || 
|-id=326 bgcolor=#d6d6d6
| 233326 ||  || — || January 31, 2006 || Kitt Peak || Spacewatch || — || align=right | 5.7 km || 
|-id=327 bgcolor=#E9E9E9
| 233327 ||  || — || January 31, 2006 || Kitt Peak || Spacewatch || — || align=right | 1.6 km || 
|-id=328 bgcolor=#E9E9E9
| 233328 ||  || — || January 31, 2006 || Kitt Peak || Spacewatch || — || align=right | 1.1 km || 
|-id=329 bgcolor=#d6d6d6
| 233329 ||  || — || January 31, 2006 || Kitt Peak || Spacewatch || — || align=right | 5.2 km || 
|-id=330 bgcolor=#E9E9E9
| 233330 ||  || — || January 30, 2006 || Kitt Peak || Spacewatch || — || align=right | 1.2 km || 
|-id=331 bgcolor=#E9E9E9
| 233331 ||  || — || January 23, 2006 || Kitt Peak || Spacewatch || — || align=right | 1.0 km || 
|-id=332 bgcolor=#E9E9E9
| 233332 ||  || — || February 8, 2006 || Wrightwood || J. W. Young || HNS || align=right | 2.0 km || 
|-id=333 bgcolor=#fefefe
| 233333 ||  || — || February 2, 2006 || Kitt Peak || Spacewatch || NYS || align=right data-sort-value="0.93" | 930 m || 
|-id=334 bgcolor=#fefefe
| 233334 ||  || — || February 2, 2006 || Kitt Peak || Spacewatch || SUL || align=right | 2.5 km || 
|-id=335 bgcolor=#E9E9E9
| 233335 ||  || — || February 2, 2006 || Mount Lemmon || Mount Lemmon Survey || — || align=right | 2.6 km || 
|-id=336 bgcolor=#E9E9E9
| 233336 ||  || — || February 3, 2006 || Mount Lemmon || Mount Lemmon Survey || — || align=right | 1.9 km || 
|-id=337 bgcolor=#E9E9E9
| 233337 ||  || — || February 6, 2006 || Anderson Mesa || LONEOS || — || align=right | 2.8 km || 
|-id=338 bgcolor=#fefefe
| 233338 ||  || — || February 6, 2006 || Mount Lemmon || Mount Lemmon Survey || MAS || align=right | 1.6 km || 
|-id=339 bgcolor=#E9E9E9
| 233339 || 2006 DT || — || February 20, 2006 || Marly || Naef Obs. || — || align=right | 2.3 km || 
|-id=340 bgcolor=#E9E9E9
| 233340 ||  || — || February 21, 2006 || Catalina || CSS || — || align=right | 2.5 km || 
|-id=341 bgcolor=#E9E9E9
| 233341 ||  || — || February 20, 2006 || Kitt Peak || Spacewatch || — || align=right | 2.0 km || 
|-id=342 bgcolor=#E9E9E9
| 233342 ||  || — || February 20, 2006 || Catalina || CSS || — || align=right | 3.0 km || 
|-id=343 bgcolor=#E9E9E9
| 233343 ||  || — || February 22, 2006 || Catalina || CSS || — || align=right | 3.0 km || 
|-id=344 bgcolor=#E9E9E9
| 233344 ||  || — || February 20, 2006 || Kitt Peak || Spacewatch || HEN || align=right | 1.4 km || 
|-id=345 bgcolor=#E9E9E9
| 233345 ||  || — || February 20, 2006 || Catalina || CSS || — || align=right | 1.6 km || 
|-id=346 bgcolor=#E9E9E9
| 233346 ||  || — || February 20, 2006 || Kitt Peak || Spacewatch || — || align=right | 1.4 km || 
|-id=347 bgcolor=#E9E9E9
| 233347 ||  || — || February 20, 2006 || Mount Lemmon || Mount Lemmon Survey || — || align=right | 2.1 km || 
|-id=348 bgcolor=#E9E9E9
| 233348 ||  || — || February 20, 2006 || Kitt Peak || Spacewatch || — || align=right | 2.1 km || 
|-id=349 bgcolor=#E9E9E9
| 233349 ||  || — || February 23, 2006 || Anderson Mesa || LONEOS || MAR || align=right | 1.9 km || 
|-id=350 bgcolor=#E9E9E9
| 233350 ||  || — || February 24, 2006 || Kitt Peak || Spacewatch || JUN || align=right | 2.3 km || 
|-id=351 bgcolor=#E9E9E9
| 233351 ||  || — || February 24, 2006 || Palomar || NEAT || — || align=right | 1.9 km || 
|-id=352 bgcolor=#E9E9E9
| 233352 ||  || — || February 21, 2006 || Mount Lemmon || Mount Lemmon Survey || — || align=right | 3.5 km || 
|-id=353 bgcolor=#E9E9E9
| 233353 ||  || — || February 21, 2006 || Mount Lemmon || Mount Lemmon Survey || — || align=right | 1.3 km || 
|-id=354 bgcolor=#E9E9E9
| 233354 ||  || — || February 21, 2006 || Mount Lemmon || Mount Lemmon Survey || — || align=right | 1.3 km || 
|-id=355 bgcolor=#E9E9E9
| 233355 ||  || — || February 24, 2006 || Kitt Peak || Spacewatch || — || align=right | 1.4 km || 
|-id=356 bgcolor=#E9E9E9
| 233356 ||  || — || February 24, 2006 || Kitt Peak || Spacewatch || — || align=right | 1.0 km || 
|-id=357 bgcolor=#E9E9E9
| 233357 ||  || — || February 24, 2006 || Socorro || LINEAR || — || align=right | 2.5 km || 
|-id=358 bgcolor=#E9E9E9
| 233358 ||  || — || February 24, 2006 || Kitt Peak || Spacewatch || — || align=right | 2.6 km || 
|-id=359 bgcolor=#E9E9E9
| 233359 ||  || — || February 24, 2006 || Kitt Peak || Spacewatch || — || align=right | 1.8 km || 
|-id=360 bgcolor=#E9E9E9
| 233360 ||  || — || February 24, 2006 || Mount Lemmon || Mount Lemmon Survey || — || align=right | 1.8 km || 
|-id=361 bgcolor=#E9E9E9
| 233361 ||  || — || February 25, 2006 || Mount Lemmon || Mount Lemmon Survey || AST || align=right | 1.9 km || 
|-id=362 bgcolor=#E9E9E9
| 233362 ||  || — || February 27, 2006 || Kitt Peak || Spacewatch || — || align=right | 1.3 km || 
|-id=363 bgcolor=#E9E9E9
| 233363 ||  || — || February 24, 2006 || Mount Lemmon || Mount Lemmon Survey || — || align=right | 2.1 km || 
|-id=364 bgcolor=#E9E9E9
| 233364 ||  || — || February 24, 2006 || Mount Lemmon || Mount Lemmon Survey || — || align=right | 1.9 km || 
|-id=365 bgcolor=#E9E9E9
| 233365 ||  || — || February 24, 2006 || Mount Lemmon || Mount Lemmon Survey || HEN || align=right | 1.2 km || 
|-id=366 bgcolor=#E9E9E9
| 233366 ||  || — || February 25, 2006 || Kitt Peak || Spacewatch || — || align=right | 2.6 km || 
|-id=367 bgcolor=#E9E9E9
| 233367 ||  || — || February 25, 2006 || Mount Lemmon || Mount Lemmon Survey || — || align=right | 1.7 km || 
|-id=368 bgcolor=#E9E9E9
| 233368 ||  || — || February 25, 2006 || Kitt Peak || Spacewatch || — || align=right | 3.5 km || 
|-id=369 bgcolor=#E9E9E9
| 233369 ||  || — || February 25, 2006 || Kitt Peak || Spacewatch || — || align=right | 1.6 km || 
|-id=370 bgcolor=#E9E9E9
| 233370 ||  || — || February 27, 2006 || Kitt Peak || Spacewatch || — || align=right data-sort-value="0.97" | 970 m || 
|-id=371 bgcolor=#E9E9E9
| 233371 ||  || — || February 27, 2006 || Kitt Peak || Spacewatch || — || align=right | 3.5 km || 
|-id=372 bgcolor=#E9E9E9
| 233372 ||  || — || February 27, 2006 || Mount Lemmon || Mount Lemmon Survey || — || align=right | 1.2 km || 
|-id=373 bgcolor=#E9E9E9
| 233373 ||  || — || February 27, 2006 || Kitt Peak || Spacewatch || — || align=right | 3.3 km || 
|-id=374 bgcolor=#E9E9E9
| 233374 ||  || — || February 27, 2006 || Kitt Peak || Spacewatch || — || align=right | 1.0 km || 
|-id=375 bgcolor=#E9E9E9
| 233375 ||  || — || February 27, 2006 || Kitt Peak || Spacewatch || — || align=right | 2.0 km || 
|-id=376 bgcolor=#E9E9E9
| 233376 ||  || — || February 28, 2006 || Mount Lemmon || Mount Lemmon Survey || — || align=right | 1.0 km || 
|-id=377 bgcolor=#E9E9E9
| 233377 ||  || — || February 25, 2006 || Catalina || CSS || GER || align=right | 2.8 km || 
|-id=378 bgcolor=#E9E9E9
| 233378 ||  || — || February 23, 2006 || Anderson Mesa || LONEOS || — || align=right | 1.7 km || 
|-id=379 bgcolor=#E9E9E9
| 233379 ||  || — || February 20, 2006 || Kitt Peak || Spacewatch || — || align=right | 1.6 km || 
|-id=380 bgcolor=#E9E9E9
| 233380 ||  || — || February 26, 2006 || Kitt Peak || Spacewatch || — || align=right | 2.8 km || 
|-id=381 bgcolor=#d6d6d6
| 233381 ||  || — || February 24, 2006 || Kitt Peak || Spacewatch || CHA || align=right | 1.8 km || 
|-id=382 bgcolor=#E9E9E9
| 233382 ||  || — || February 20, 2006 || Mount Lemmon || Mount Lemmon Survey || — || align=right | 1.8 km || 
|-id=383 bgcolor=#E9E9E9
| 233383 Assisneto ||  ||  || March 4, 2006 || Nogales || J.-C. Merlin || — || align=right data-sort-value="0.98" | 980 m || 
|-id=384 bgcolor=#E9E9E9
| 233384 ||  || — || March 2, 2006 || Kitt Peak || Spacewatch || — || align=right | 3.1 km || 
|-id=385 bgcolor=#d6d6d6
| 233385 ||  || — || March 2, 2006 || Kitt Peak || Spacewatch || — || align=right | 3.7 km || 
|-id=386 bgcolor=#E9E9E9
| 233386 ||  || — || March 2, 2006 || Kitt Peak || Spacewatch || — || align=right | 2.4 km || 
|-id=387 bgcolor=#E9E9E9
| 233387 ||  || — || March 3, 2006 || Kitt Peak || Spacewatch || — || align=right | 1.3 km || 
|-id=388 bgcolor=#E9E9E9
| 233388 ||  || — || March 3, 2006 || Mount Lemmon || Mount Lemmon Survey || — || align=right | 1.5 km || 
|-id=389 bgcolor=#E9E9E9
| 233389 ||  || — || March 3, 2006 || Mount Lemmon || Mount Lemmon Survey || — || align=right | 2.1 km || 
|-id=390 bgcolor=#d6d6d6
| 233390 ||  || — || March 3, 2006 || Kitt Peak || Spacewatch || — || align=right | 4.2 km || 
|-id=391 bgcolor=#E9E9E9
| 233391 ||  || — || March 4, 2006 || Kitt Peak || Spacewatch || — || align=right | 2.2 km || 
|-id=392 bgcolor=#E9E9E9
| 233392 ||  || — || March 23, 2006 || Mount Lemmon || Mount Lemmon Survey || — || align=right | 2.2 km || 
|-id=393 bgcolor=#FA8072
| 233393 ||  || — || March 23, 2006 || Kitt Peak || Spacewatch || — || align=right | 1.4 km || 
|-id=394 bgcolor=#E9E9E9
| 233394 ||  || — || March 23, 2006 || Kitt Peak || Spacewatch || — || align=right | 2.9 km || 
|-id=395 bgcolor=#E9E9E9
| 233395 ||  || — || March 24, 2006 || Mount Lemmon || Mount Lemmon Survey || — || align=right | 1.2 km || 
|-id=396 bgcolor=#E9E9E9
| 233396 ||  || — || March 24, 2006 || Mount Lemmon || Mount Lemmon Survey || — || align=right | 2.0 km || 
|-id=397 bgcolor=#E9E9E9
| 233397 ||  || — || March 24, 2006 || Mount Lemmon || Mount Lemmon Survey || — || align=right | 2.4 km || 
|-id=398 bgcolor=#E9E9E9
| 233398 ||  || — || March 24, 2006 || Mount Lemmon || Mount Lemmon Survey || — || align=right | 2.5 km || 
|-id=399 bgcolor=#d6d6d6
| 233399 ||  || — || March 24, 2006 || Siding Spring || SSS || — || align=right | 6.8 km || 
|-id=400 bgcolor=#E9E9E9
| 233400 ||  || — || March 24, 2006 || Catalina || CSS || ADE || align=right | 4.2 km || 
|}

233401–233500 

|-bgcolor=#E9E9E9
| 233401 ||  || — || March 23, 2006 || Mount Lemmon || Mount Lemmon Survey || — || align=right | 1.7 km || 
|-id=402 bgcolor=#E9E9E9
| 233402 ||  || — || March 26, 2006 || Mount Lemmon || Mount Lemmon Survey || — || align=right | 1.8 km || 
|-id=403 bgcolor=#fefefe
| 233403 ||  || — || March 24, 2006 || Mount Lemmon || Mount Lemmon Survey || — || align=right | 2.1 km || 
|-id=404 bgcolor=#E9E9E9
| 233404 ||  || — || March 23, 2006 || Socorro || LINEAR || — || align=right | 3.9 km || 
|-id=405 bgcolor=#E9E9E9
| 233405 ||  || — || March 24, 2006 || Anderson Mesa || LONEOS || — || align=right | 1.3 km || 
|-id=406 bgcolor=#E9E9E9
| 233406 ||  || — || March 25, 2006 || Kitt Peak || Spacewatch || — || align=right | 3.6 km || 
|-id=407 bgcolor=#E9E9E9
| 233407 ||  || — || April 2, 2006 || Kitt Peak || Spacewatch || — || align=right | 1.3 km || 
|-id=408 bgcolor=#E9E9E9
| 233408 ||  || — || April 2, 2006 || Kitt Peak || Spacewatch || — || align=right | 2.5 km || 
|-id=409 bgcolor=#E9E9E9
| 233409 ||  || — || April 2, 2006 || Kitt Peak || Spacewatch || — || align=right | 1.6 km || 
|-id=410 bgcolor=#d6d6d6
| 233410 ||  || — || April 2, 2006 || Kitt Peak || Spacewatch || — || align=right | 3.8 km || 
|-id=411 bgcolor=#E9E9E9
| 233411 ||  || — || April 2, 2006 || Mount Lemmon || Mount Lemmon Survey || — || align=right | 1.3 km || 
|-id=412 bgcolor=#d6d6d6
| 233412 ||  || — || April 2, 2006 || Mount Lemmon || Mount Lemmon Survey || K-2 || align=right | 1.9 km || 
|-id=413 bgcolor=#E9E9E9
| 233413 ||  || — || April 2, 2006 || Jarnac || Jarnac Obs. || — || align=right | 3.1 km || 
|-id=414 bgcolor=#E9E9E9
| 233414 ||  || — || April 6, 2006 || Socorro || LINEAR || — || align=right | 1.9 km || 
|-id=415 bgcolor=#E9E9E9
| 233415 ||  || — || April 8, 2006 || Catalina || CSS || — || align=right | 4.1 km || 
|-id=416 bgcolor=#E9E9E9
| 233416 ||  || — || April 9, 2006 || Mount Lemmon || Mount Lemmon Survey || DOR || align=right | 3.1 km || 
|-id=417 bgcolor=#E9E9E9
| 233417 ||  || — || April 8, 2006 || Siding Spring || SSS || — || align=right | 4.2 km || 
|-id=418 bgcolor=#E9E9E9
| 233418 ||  || — || April 9, 2006 || Siding Spring || SSS || — || align=right | 2.0 km || 
|-id=419 bgcolor=#E9E9E9
| 233419 ||  || — || April 8, 2006 || Socorro || LINEAR || — || align=right | 3.0 km || 
|-id=420 bgcolor=#E9E9E9
| 233420 ||  || — || April 18, 2006 || Kitt Peak || Spacewatch || AGN || align=right | 1.4 km || 
|-id=421 bgcolor=#E9E9E9
| 233421 ||  || — || April 18, 2006 || Palomar || NEAT || NEM || align=right | 3.7 km || 
|-id=422 bgcolor=#E9E9E9
| 233422 ||  || — || April 19, 2006 || Palomar || NEAT || — || align=right | 3.5 km || 
|-id=423 bgcolor=#E9E9E9
| 233423 ||  || — || April 20, 2006 || Mayhill || A. Lowe || — || align=right | 1.4 km || 
|-id=424 bgcolor=#d6d6d6
| 233424 ||  || — || April 19, 2006 || Kitt Peak || Spacewatch || — || align=right | 3.3 km || 
|-id=425 bgcolor=#E9E9E9
| 233425 ||  || — || April 19, 2006 || Mount Lemmon || Mount Lemmon Survey || — || align=right | 2.4 km || 
|-id=426 bgcolor=#E9E9E9
| 233426 ||  || — || April 20, 2006 || Kitt Peak || Spacewatch || HOF || align=right | 3.0 km || 
|-id=427 bgcolor=#E9E9E9
| 233427 ||  || — || April 19, 2006 || Kitt Peak || Spacewatch || NEM || align=right | 2.8 km || 
|-id=428 bgcolor=#d6d6d6
| 233428 ||  || — || April 19, 2006 || Kitt Peak || Spacewatch || — || align=right | 4.8 km || 
|-id=429 bgcolor=#E9E9E9
| 233429 ||  || — || April 21, 2006 || Catalina || CSS || — || align=right | 2.7 km || 
|-id=430 bgcolor=#d6d6d6
| 233430 ||  || — || April 21, 2006 || Kitt Peak || Spacewatch || — || align=right | 4.0 km || 
|-id=431 bgcolor=#d6d6d6
| 233431 ||  || — || April 25, 2006 || Kitt Peak || Spacewatch || KOR || align=right | 1.9 km || 
|-id=432 bgcolor=#E9E9E9
| 233432 ||  || — || April 19, 2006 || Catalina || CSS || MIT || align=right | 3.2 km || 
|-id=433 bgcolor=#E9E9E9
| 233433 ||  || — || April 21, 2006 || Catalina || CSS || — || align=right | 3.2 km || 
|-id=434 bgcolor=#E9E9E9
| 233434 ||  || — || April 26, 2006 || Catalina || CSS || MIT || align=right | 3.6 km || 
|-id=435 bgcolor=#E9E9E9
| 233435 ||  || — || April 30, 2006 || Kanab || E. E. Sheridan || MRX || align=right | 1.0 km || 
|-id=436 bgcolor=#E9E9E9
| 233436 ||  || — || April 24, 2006 || Kitt Peak || Spacewatch || — || align=right | 2.9 km || 
|-id=437 bgcolor=#E9E9E9
| 233437 ||  || — || April 24, 2006 || Mount Lemmon || Mount Lemmon Survey || AGN || align=right | 1.9 km || 
|-id=438 bgcolor=#d6d6d6
| 233438 ||  || — || April 25, 2006 || Kitt Peak || Spacewatch || — || align=right | 3.3 km || 
|-id=439 bgcolor=#d6d6d6
| 233439 ||  || — || April 25, 2006 || Kitt Peak || Spacewatch || HYG || align=right | 4.1 km || 
|-id=440 bgcolor=#E9E9E9
| 233440 ||  || — || April 25, 2006 || Kitt Peak || Spacewatch || NEM || align=right | 2.5 km || 
|-id=441 bgcolor=#d6d6d6
| 233441 ||  || — || April 26, 2006 || Kitt Peak || Spacewatch || — || align=right | 3.9 km || 
|-id=442 bgcolor=#E9E9E9
| 233442 ||  || — || April 26, 2006 || Kitt Peak || Spacewatch || — || align=right | 2.8 km || 
|-id=443 bgcolor=#d6d6d6
| 233443 ||  || — || April 30, 2006 || Kitt Peak || Spacewatch || — || align=right | 2.6 km || 
|-id=444 bgcolor=#E9E9E9
| 233444 ||  || — || April 29, 2006 || Kitt Peak || Spacewatch || — || align=right | 3.6 km || 
|-id=445 bgcolor=#d6d6d6
| 233445 ||  || — || April 30, 2006 || Kitt Peak || Spacewatch || — || align=right | 3.7 km || 
|-id=446 bgcolor=#E9E9E9
| 233446 ||  || — || April 30, 2006 || Kitt Peak || Spacewatch || HNA || align=right | 3.7 km || 
|-id=447 bgcolor=#E9E9E9
| 233447 ||  || — || April 30, 2006 || Kitt Peak || Spacewatch || — || align=right | 3.3 km || 
|-id=448 bgcolor=#E9E9E9
| 233448 ||  || — || April 30, 2006 || Catalina || CSS || — || align=right | 3.9 km || 
|-id=449 bgcolor=#d6d6d6
| 233449 ||  || — || April 30, 2006 || Kitt Peak || Spacewatch || — || align=right | 3.9 km || 
|-id=450 bgcolor=#E9E9E9
| 233450 ||  || — || April 26, 2006 || Siding Spring || SSS || — || align=right | 2.3 km || 
|-id=451 bgcolor=#E9E9E9
| 233451 ||  || — || April 26, 2006 || Kitt Peak || Spacewatch || — || align=right | 2.5 km || 
|-id=452 bgcolor=#d6d6d6
| 233452 ||  || — || May 2, 2006 || Mount Lemmon || Mount Lemmon Survey || KOR || align=right | 1.6 km || 
|-id=453 bgcolor=#d6d6d6
| 233453 ||  || — || May 2, 2006 || Mount Lemmon || Mount Lemmon Survey || KOR || align=right | 1.5 km || 
|-id=454 bgcolor=#E9E9E9
| 233454 ||  || — || May 2, 2006 || Mount Lemmon || Mount Lemmon Survey || AST || align=right | 2.8 km || 
|-id=455 bgcolor=#E9E9E9
| 233455 ||  || — || May 2, 2006 || Kitt Peak || Spacewatch || GEF || align=right | 1.8 km || 
|-id=456 bgcolor=#E9E9E9
| 233456 ||  || — || May 6, 2006 || Kitt Peak || Spacewatch || EUN || align=right | 1.9 km || 
|-id=457 bgcolor=#d6d6d6
| 233457 ||  || — || May 2, 2006 || Kitt Peak || Spacewatch || — || align=right | 3.8 km || 
|-id=458 bgcolor=#E9E9E9
| 233458 ||  || — || May 1, 2006 || Catalina || CSS || — || align=right | 2.3 km || 
|-id=459 bgcolor=#d6d6d6
| 233459 ||  || — || May 1, 2006 || Kitt Peak || M. W. Buie || — || align=right | 5.6 km || 
|-id=460 bgcolor=#E9E9E9
| 233460 ||  || — || May 18, 2006 || Palomar || NEAT || — || align=right | 2.3 km || 
|-id=461 bgcolor=#d6d6d6
| 233461 ||  || — || May 19, 2006 || Mount Lemmon || Mount Lemmon Survey || — || align=right | 3.1 km || 
|-id=462 bgcolor=#d6d6d6
| 233462 ||  || — || May 20, 2006 || Kitt Peak || Spacewatch || EOS || align=right | 3.2 km || 
|-id=463 bgcolor=#d6d6d6
| 233463 ||  || — || May 20, 2006 || Palomar || NEAT || — || align=right | 4.9 km || 
|-id=464 bgcolor=#d6d6d6
| 233464 ||  || — || May 21, 2006 || Kitt Peak || Spacewatch || — || align=right | 4.7 km || 
|-id=465 bgcolor=#d6d6d6
| 233465 ||  || — || May 20, 2006 || Kitt Peak || Spacewatch || KAR || align=right | 1.5 km || 
|-id=466 bgcolor=#d6d6d6
| 233466 ||  || — || May 21, 2006 || Kitt Peak || Spacewatch || KOR || align=right | 1.4 km || 
|-id=467 bgcolor=#d6d6d6
| 233467 ||  || — || May 23, 2006 || Kitt Peak || Spacewatch || — || align=right | 3.0 km || 
|-id=468 bgcolor=#E9E9E9
| 233468 ||  || — || May 25, 2006 || Mount Lemmon || Mount Lemmon Survey || — || align=right | 2.9 km || 
|-id=469 bgcolor=#E9E9E9
| 233469 ||  || — || May 29, 2006 || Mayhill || A. Lowe || — || align=right | 2.1 km || 
|-id=470 bgcolor=#d6d6d6
| 233470 ||  || — || May 31, 2006 || Mount Lemmon || Mount Lemmon Survey || — || align=right | 3.2 km || 
|-id=471 bgcolor=#d6d6d6
| 233471 ||  || — || May 31, 2006 || Mount Lemmon || Mount Lemmon Survey || — || align=right | 3.1 km || 
|-id=472 bgcolor=#d6d6d6
| 233472 Moorcroft ||  ||  || May 25, 2006 || Mauna Kea || P. A. Wiegert || — || align=right | 2.7 km || 
|-id=473 bgcolor=#d6d6d6
| 233473 ||  || — || June 15, 2006 || Siding Spring || SSS || — || align=right | 4.3 km || 
|-id=474 bgcolor=#E9E9E9
| 233474 ||  || — || June 17, 2006 || Kitt Peak || Spacewatch || GEF || align=right | 1.7 km || 
|-id=475 bgcolor=#d6d6d6
| 233475 ||  || — || August 13, 2006 || Palomar || NEAT || — || align=right | 5.0 km || 
|-id=476 bgcolor=#d6d6d6
| 233476 ||  || — || August 19, 2006 || Anderson Mesa || LONEOS || HYG || align=right | 4.4 km || 
|-id=477 bgcolor=#d6d6d6
| 233477 ||  || — || September 15, 2006 || Kitt Peak || Spacewatch || — || align=right | 4.5 km || 
|-id=478 bgcolor=#FA8072
| 233478 ||  || — || September 18, 2006 || Siding Spring || SSS || H || align=right | 1.2 km || 
|-id=479 bgcolor=#d6d6d6
| 233479 ||  || — || September 17, 2006 || Kitt Peak || Spacewatch || ALA || align=right | 6.6 km || 
|-id=480 bgcolor=#d6d6d6
| 233480 ||  || — || September 16, 2006 || Catalina || CSS || — || align=right | 6.7 km || 
|-id=481 bgcolor=#d6d6d6
| 233481 ||  || — || September 17, 2006 || Kitt Peak || Spacewatch || HYG || align=right | 4.7 km || 
|-id=482 bgcolor=#d6d6d6
| 233482 ||  || — || September 19, 2006 || Kitt Peak || Spacewatch || — || align=right | 5.8 km || 
|-id=483 bgcolor=#d6d6d6
| 233483 ||  || — || September 30, 2006 || Catalina || CSS || — || align=right | 6.1 km || 
|-id=484 bgcolor=#d6d6d6
| 233484 ||  || — || September 30, 2006 || Kitt Peak || Spacewatch || — || align=right | 6.4 km || 
|-id=485 bgcolor=#d6d6d6
| 233485 ||  || — || October 11, 2006 || Palomar || NEAT || — || align=right | 4.8 km || 
|-id=486 bgcolor=#d6d6d6
| 233486 ||  || — || October 16, 2006 || Piszkéstető || K. Sárneczky, Z. Kuli || — || align=right | 6.0 km || 
|-id=487 bgcolor=#E9E9E9
| 233487 ||  || — || December 11, 2006 || Kitt Peak || Spacewatch || EUN || align=right | 2.6 km || 
|-id=488 bgcolor=#fefefe
| 233488 Cosandey || 2006 YG ||  || December 16, 2006 || Vicques || M. Ory || H || align=right data-sort-value="0.86" | 860 m || 
|-id=489 bgcolor=#fefefe
| 233489 ||  || — || January 15, 2007 || Catalina || CSS || H || align=right data-sort-value="0.90" | 900 m || 
|-id=490 bgcolor=#fefefe
| 233490 ||  || — || January 17, 2007 || Kitt Peak || Spacewatch || — || align=right data-sort-value="0.80" | 800 m || 
|-id=491 bgcolor=#fefefe
| 233491 ||  || — || February 7, 2007 || Kitt Peak || Spacewatch || — || align=right data-sort-value="0.77" | 770 m || 
|-id=492 bgcolor=#fefefe
| 233492 ||  || — || February 6, 2007 || Palomar || NEAT || — || align=right | 1.7 km || 
|-id=493 bgcolor=#fefefe
| 233493 ||  || — || February 7, 2007 || Catalina || CSS || — || align=right | 1.3 km || 
|-id=494 bgcolor=#fefefe
| 233494 ||  || — || February 12, 2007 || Junk Bond || D. Healy || — || align=right | 1.0 km || 
|-id=495 bgcolor=#E9E9E9
| 233495 ||  || — || February 21, 2007 || Mount Lemmon || Mount Lemmon Survey || — || align=right | 3.6 km || 
|-id=496 bgcolor=#fefefe
| 233496 ||  || — || February 17, 2007 || Kitt Peak || Spacewatch || — || align=right data-sort-value="0.84" | 840 m || 
|-id=497 bgcolor=#fefefe
| 233497 ||  || — || February 23, 2007 || Kitt Peak || Spacewatch || — || align=right | 1.8 km || 
|-id=498 bgcolor=#fefefe
| 233498 ||  || — || March 9, 2007 || Kitt Peak || Spacewatch || — || align=right data-sort-value="0.73" | 730 m || 
|-id=499 bgcolor=#fefefe
| 233499 ||  || — || March 9, 2007 || Kitt Peak || Spacewatch || NYS || align=right data-sort-value="0.77" | 770 m || 
|-id=500 bgcolor=#fefefe
| 233500 ||  || — || March 10, 2007 || Mount Lemmon || Mount Lemmon Survey || NYS || align=right data-sort-value="0.83" | 830 m || 
|}

233501–233600 

|-bgcolor=#fefefe
| 233501 ||  || — || March 9, 2007 || Kitt Peak || Spacewatch || — || align=right | 1.1 km || 
|-id=502 bgcolor=#fefefe
| 233502 ||  || — || March 10, 2007 || Kitt Peak || Spacewatch || — || align=right data-sort-value="0.89" | 890 m || 
|-id=503 bgcolor=#E9E9E9
| 233503 ||  || — || March 10, 2007 || Mount Lemmon || Mount Lemmon Survey || — || align=right | 3.3 km || 
|-id=504 bgcolor=#fefefe
| 233504 ||  || — || March 10, 2007 || Kitt Peak || Spacewatch || — || align=right data-sort-value="0.88" | 880 m || 
|-id=505 bgcolor=#fefefe
| 233505 ||  || — || March 11, 2007 || Mount Lemmon || Mount Lemmon Survey || — || align=right | 1.2 km || 
|-id=506 bgcolor=#E9E9E9
| 233506 ||  || — || March 11, 2007 || Kitt Peak || Spacewatch || AGN || align=right | 1.8 km || 
|-id=507 bgcolor=#fefefe
| 233507 ||  || — || March 12, 2007 || Kitt Peak || Spacewatch || — || align=right data-sort-value="0.95" | 950 m || 
|-id=508 bgcolor=#fefefe
| 233508 ||  || — || March 14, 2007 || Catalina || CSS || FLO || align=right data-sort-value="0.84" | 840 m || 
|-id=509 bgcolor=#fefefe
| 233509 ||  || — || March 14, 2007 || Catalina || CSS || — || align=right | 1.2 km || 
|-id=510 bgcolor=#fefefe
| 233510 ||  || — || March 13, 2007 || Kitt Peak || Spacewatch || FLO || align=right data-sort-value="0.78" | 780 m || 
|-id=511 bgcolor=#fefefe
| 233511 ||  || — || March 14, 2007 || Kitt Peak || Spacewatch || — || align=right data-sort-value="0.90" | 900 m || 
|-id=512 bgcolor=#fefefe
| 233512 ||  || — || March 13, 2007 || Catalina || CSS || FLO || align=right | 1.4 km || 
|-id=513 bgcolor=#fefefe
| 233513 ||  || — || March 11, 2007 || Kitt Peak || Spacewatch || V || align=right data-sort-value="0.92" | 920 m || 
|-id=514 bgcolor=#fefefe
| 233514 ||  || — || March 8, 2007 || Palomar || NEAT || — || align=right data-sort-value="0.84" | 840 m || 
|-id=515 bgcolor=#fefefe
| 233515 ||  || — || March 19, 2007 || Catalina || CSS || V || align=right data-sort-value="0.81" | 810 m || 
|-id=516 bgcolor=#fefefe
| 233516 ||  || — || March 20, 2007 || Kitt Peak || Spacewatch || — || align=right | 1.2 km || 
|-id=517 bgcolor=#fefefe
| 233517 ||  || — || April 11, 2007 || Kitt Peak || Spacewatch || V || align=right data-sort-value="0.84" | 840 m || 
|-id=518 bgcolor=#d6d6d6
| 233518 ||  || — || April 11, 2007 || Catalina || CSS || — || align=right | 8.8 km || 
|-id=519 bgcolor=#E9E9E9
| 233519 ||  || — || April 14, 2007 || Kitt Peak || Spacewatch || KON || align=right | 3.4 km || 
|-id=520 bgcolor=#fefefe
| 233520 ||  || — || April 14, 2007 || Kitt Peak || Spacewatch || — || align=right data-sort-value="0.98" | 980 m || 
|-id=521 bgcolor=#fefefe
| 233521 ||  || — || April 14, 2007 || Kitt Peak || Spacewatch || — || align=right | 1.4 km || 
|-id=522 bgcolor=#fefefe
| 233522 Moye ||  ||  || April 18, 2007 || Pises || Pises Obs. || — || align=right | 1.1 km || 
|-id=523 bgcolor=#E9E9E9
| 233523 ||  || — || April 16, 2007 || Socorro || LINEAR || — || align=right | 3.3 km || 
|-id=524 bgcolor=#fefefe
| 233524 ||  || — || April 18, 2007 || Kitt Peak || Spacewatch || — || align=right data-sort-value="0.83" | 830 m || 
|-id=525 bgcolor=#E9E9E9
| 233525 ||  || — || April 19, 2007 || Kitt Peak || Spacewatch || — || align=right | 1.8 km || 
|-id=526 bgcolor=#fefefe
| 233526 ||  || — || April 18, 2007 || Kitt Peak || Spacewatch || — || align=right data-sort-value="0.82" | 820 m || 
|-id=527 bgcolor=#E9E9E9
| 233527 ||  || — || April 19, 2007 || Kitt Peak || Spacewatch || HOF || align=right | 3.3 km || 
|-id=528 bgcolor=#E9E9E9
| 233528 ||  || — || April 19, 2007 || Mount Lemmon || Mount Lemmon Survey || — || align=right | 6.2 km || 
|-id=529 bgcolor=#fefefe
| 233529 ||  || — || April 19, 2007 || Kitt Peak || Spacewatch || — || align=right data-sort-value="0.97" | 970 m || 
|-id=530 bgcolor=#d6d6d6
| 233530 ||  || — || April 22, 2007 || Mount Lemmon || Mount Lemmon Survey || EOS || align=right | 3.3 km || 
|-id=531 bgcolor=#fefefe
| 233531 ||  || — || April 20, 2007 || Kitt Peak || Spacewatch || V || align=right data-sort-value="0.80" | 800 m || 
|-id=532 bgcolor=#E9E9E9
| 233532 ||  || — || April 23, 2007 || Kitt Peak || Spacewatch || — || align=right | 1.3 km || 
|-id=533 bgcolor=#fefefe
| 233533 ||  || — || April 23, 2007 || Kitt Peak || Spacewatch || NYS || align=right | 1.8 km || 
|-id=534 bgcolor=#fefefe
| 233534 ||  || — || April 22, 2007 || Kitt Peak || Spacewatch || NYS || align=right data-sort-value="0.70" | 700 m || 
|-id=535 bgcolor=#fefefe
| 233535 ||  || — || April 23, 2007 || Catalina || CSS || MAS || align=right data-sort-value="0.92" | 920 m || 
|-id=536 bgcolor=#E9E9E9
| 233536 ||  || — || April 23, 2007 || Kitt Peak || Spacewatch || — || align=right | 1.8 km || 
|-id=537 bgcolor=#fefefe
| 233537 ||  || — || April 24, 2007 || Kitt Peak || Spacewatch || NYS || align=right data-sort-value="0.84" | 840 m || 
|-id=538 bgcolor=#E9E9E9
| 233538 ||  || — || April 25, 2007 || Kitt Peak || Spacewatch || — || align=right | 5.2 km || 
|-id=539 bgcolor=#fefefe
| 233539 ||  || — || April 25, 2007 || Kitt Peak || Spacewatch || V || align=right | 1.1 km || 
|-id=540 bgcolor=#d6d6d6
| 233540 ||  || — || May 7, 2007 || Kitt Peak || Spacewatch || — || align=right | 5.6 km || 
|-id=541 bgcolor=#d6d6d6
| 233541 ||  || — || May 10, 2007 || Mount Lemmon || Mount Lemmon Survey || — || align=right | 5.3 km || 
|-id=542 bgcolor=#fefefe
| 233542 ||  || — || May 9, 2007 || Kitt Peak || Spacewatch || — || align=right data-sort-value="0.88" | 880 m || 
|-id=543 bgcolor=#fefefe
| 233543 ||  || — || May 12, 2007 || Tiki || S. F. Hönig, N. Teamo || — || align=right | 1.1 km || 
|-id=544 bgcolor=#E9E9E9
| 233544 ||  || — || May 11, 2007 || Lulin Observatory || LUSS || — || align=right | 1.6 km || 
|-id=545 bgcolor=#d6d6d6
| 233545 ||  || — || May 9, 2007 || Kitt Peak || Spacewatch || — || align=right | 4.3 km || 
|-id=546 bgcolor=#fefefe
| 233546 ||  || — || May 9, 2007 || Kitt Peak || Spacewatch || — || align=right | 1.1 km || 
|-id=547 bgcolor=#fefefe
| 233547 Luxun ||  ||  || May 9, 2007 || Lulin Observatory || Q.-z. Ye, C.-Y. Shih || — || align=right | 3.2 km || 
|-id=548 bgcolor=#fefefe
| 233548 ||  || — || May 10, 2007 || Kitt Peak || Spacewatch || — || align=right | 1.0 km || 
|-id=549 bgcolor=#fefefe
| 233549 ||  || — || May 11, 2007 || Mount Lemmon || Mount Lemmon Survey || NYS || align=right data-sort-value="0.88" | 880 m || 
|-id=550 bgcolor=#E9E9E9
| 233550 ||  || — || May 12, 2007 || Kitt Peak || Spacewatch || MIT || align=right | 3.8 km || 
|-id=551 bgcolor=#E9E9E9
| 233551 ||  || — || June 9, 2007 || Kitt Peak || Spacewatch || — || align=right | 2.2 km || 
|-id=552 bgcolor=#fefefe
| 233552 ||  || — || June 10, 2007 || Kitt Peak || Spacewatch || V || align=right data-sort-value="0.93" | 930 m || 
|-id=553 bgcolor=#fefefe
| 233553 ||  || — || June 17, 2007 || Kitt Peak || Spacewatch || — || align=right | 1.3 km || 
|-id=554 bgcolor=#d6d6d6
| 233554 ||  || — || June 23, 2007 || Tiki || N. Teamo || — || align=right | 4.6 km || 
|-id=555 bgcolor=#fefefe
| 233555 ||  || — || July 12, 2007 || Reedy Creek || J. Broughton || NYS || align=right | 2.2 km || 
|-id=556 bgcolor=#fefefe
| 233556 ||  || — || July 13, 2007 || Reedy Creek || J. Broughton || — || align=right | 1.5 km || 
|-id=557 bgcolor=#E9E9E9
| 233557 ||  || — || July 15, 2007 || Reedy Creek || J. Broughton || — || align=right | 3.5 km || 
|-id=558 bgcolor=#d6d6d6
| 233558 ||  || — || July 23, 2007 || Tiki || S. F. Hönig, N. Teamo || KOR || align=right | 1.9 km || 
|-id=559 bgcolor=#E9E9E9
| 233559 Pizzetti ||  ||  || August 4, 2007 || Lumezzane || W. Marinello, M. Micheli || — || align=right | 3.6 km || 
|-id=560 bgcolor=#E9E9E9
| 233560 ||  || — || August 4, 2007 || Reedy Creek || J. Broughton || — || align=right | 2.9 km || 
|-id=561 bgcolor=#d6d6d6
| 233561 ||  || — || August 6, 2007 || Tiki || N. Teamo, J.-C. Pelle || KOR || align=right | 1.7 km || 
|-id=562 bgcolor=#fefefe
| 233562 ||  || — || August 8, 2007 || Tiki || N. Teamo, J.-C. Pelle || NYS || align=right | 1.0 km || 
|-id=563 bgcolor=#fefefe
| 233563 ||  || — || August 7, 2007 || Reedy Creek || J. Broughton || ERI || align=right | 2.5 km || 
|-id=564 bgcolor=#E9E9E9
| 233564 ||  || — || August 11, 2007 || Anderson Mesa || LONEOS || — || align=right | 1.9 km || 
|-id=565 bgcolor=#d6d6d6
| 233565 ||  || — || August 8, 2007 || Socorro || LINEAR || — || align=right | 6.4 km || 
|-id=566 bgcolor=#d6d6d6
| 233566 ||  || — || August 8, 2007 || Socorro || LINEAR || EUP || align=right | 6.7 km || 
|-id=567 bgcolor=#E9E9E9
| 233567 ||  || — || August 8, 2007 || Socorro || LINEAR || GEF || align=right | 1.7 km || 
|-id=568 bgcolor=#d6d6d6
| 233568 ||  || — || August 9, 2007 || Socorro || LINEAR || — || align=right | 3.9 km || 
|-id=569 bgcolor=#d6d6d6
| 233569 ||  || — || August 9, 2007 || Socorro || LINEAR || — || align=right | 4.2 km || 
|-id=570 bgcolor=#E9E9E9
| 233570 ||  || — || August 8, 2007 || Socorro || LINEAR || DOR || align=right | 4.4 km || 
|-id=571 bgcolor=#E9E9E9
| 233571 ||  || — || August 8, 2007 || Socorro || LINEAR || MIS || align=right | 3.4 km || 
|-id=572 bgcolor=#d6d6d6
| 233572 ||  || — || August 8, 2007 || Socorro || LINEAR || CHA || align=right | 3.1 km || 
|-id=573 bgcolor=#fefefe
| 233573 ||  || — || August 9, 2007 || Socorro || LINEAR || NYS || align=right data-sort-value="0.95" | 950 m || 
|-id=574 bgcolor=#d6d6d6
| 233574 ||  || — || August 10, 2007 || Kitt Peak || Spacewatch || — || align=right | 2.5 km || 
|-id=575 bgcolor=#d6d6d6
| 233575 ||  || — || August 10, 2007 || Kitt Peak || Spacewatch || — || align=right | 2.8 km || 
|-id=576 bgcolor=#d6d6d6
| 233576 ||  || — || August 16, 2007 || Socorro || LINEAR || VER || align=right | 4.2 km || 
|-id=577 bgcolor=#E9E9E9
| 233577 ||  || — || August 17, 2007 || Bisei SG Center || BATTeRS || — || align=right | 3.2 km || 
|-id=578 bgcolor=#C2FFFF
| 233578 ||  || — || August 16, 2007 || XuYi || PMO NEO || L4 || align=right | 17 km || 
|-id=579 bgcolor=#fefefe
| 233579 ||  || — || August 21, 2007 || Anderson Mesa || LONEOS || V || align=right | 1.0 km || 
|-id=580 bgcolor=#d6d6d6
| 233580 ||  || — || August 22, 2007 || Anderson Mesa || LONEOS || — || align=right | 3.2 km || 
|-id=581 bgcolor=#E9E9E9
| 233581 ||  || — || August 22, 2007 || Anderson Mesa || LONEOS || MIT || align=right | 2.6 km || 
|-id=582 bgcolor=#E9E9E9
| 233582 ||  || — || August 24, 2007 || Kitt Peak || Spacewatch || — || align=right | 3.0 km || 
|-id=583 bgcolor=#fefefe
| 233583 ||  || — || September 1, 2007 || Siding Spring || K. Sárneczky, L. Kiss || NYS || align=right data-sort-value="0.79" | 790 m || 
|-id=584 bgcolor=#E9E9E9
| 233584 ||  || — || September 2, 2007 || Catalina || CSS || — || align=right | 3.9 km || 
|-id=585 bgcolor=#E9E9E9
| 233585 ||  || — || September 14, 2007 || Vicques || M. Ory || RAF || align=right | 1.7 km || 
|-id=586 bgcolor=#d6d6d6
| 233586 ||  || — || September 3, 2007 || Mount Lemmon || Mount Lemmon Survey || — || align=right | 4.6 km || 
|-id=587 bgcolor=#d6d6d6
| 233587 ||  || — || September 4, 2007 || Mount Lemmon || Mount Lemmon Survey || — || align=right | 2.8 km || 
|-id=588 bgcolor=#fefefe
| 233588 ||  || — || September 9, 2007 || Anderson Mesa || LONEOS || — || align=right | 2.1 km || 
|-id=589 bgcolor=#d6d6d6
| 233589 ||  || — || September 10, 2007 || Kitt Peak || Spacewatch || — || align=right | 3.7 km || 
|-id=590 bgcolor=#d6d6d6
| 233590 ||  || — || September 10, 2007 || Mount Lemmon || Mount Lemmon Survey || — || align=right | 4.3 km || 
|-id=591 bgcolor=#d6d6d6
| 233591 ||  || — || September 11, 2007 || Catalina || CSS || — || align=right | 4.9 km || 
|-id=592 bgcolor=#d6d6d6
| 233592 ||  || — || September 11, 2007 || Eskridge || G. Hug || — || align=right | 3.6 km || 
|-id=593 bgcolor=#E9E9E9
| 233593 ||  || — || September 11, 2007 || Kitt Peak || Spacewatch || AEO || align=right | 1.7 km || 
|-id=594 bgcolor=#d6d6d6
| 233594 ||  || — || September 11, 2007 || Lulin || LUSS || KOR || align=right | 2.1 km || 
|-id=595 bgcolor=#d6d6d6
| 233595 ||  || — || September 12, 2007 || Catalina || CSS || — || align=right | 4.3 km || 
|-id=596 bgcolor=#E9E9E9
| 233596 ||  || — || September 12, 2007 || Goodricke-Pigott || R. A. Tucker || — || align=right | 3.1 km || 
|-id=597 bgcolor=#d6d6d6
| 233597 ||  || — || September 13, 2007 || Goodricke-Pigott || R. A. Tucker || — || align=right | 5.2 km || 
|-id=598 bgcolor=#d6d6d6
| 233598 ||  || — || September 14, 2007 || Anderson Mesa || LONEOS || HYG || align=right | 3.5 km || 
|-id=599 bgcolor=#d6d6d6
| 233599 ||  || — || September 12, 2007 || Catalina || CSS || KOR || align=right | 1.9 km || 
|-id=600 bgcolor=#C2FFFF
| 233600 ||  || — || September 10, 2007 || Kitt Peak || Spacewatch || L4 || align=right | 13 km || 
|}

233601–233700 

|-bgcolor=#d6d6d6
| 233601 ||  || — || September 11, 2007 || Kitt Peak || Spacewatch || — || align=right | 5.1 km || 
|-id=602 bgcolor=#d6d6d6
| 233602 ||  || — || September 14, 2007 || Kitt Peak || Spacewatch || — || align=right | 5.0 km || 
|-id=603 bgcolor=#d6d6d6
| 233603 ||  || — || September 5, 2007 || Anderson Mesa || LONEOS || — || align=right | 4.1 km || 
|-id=604 bgcolor=#d6d6d6
| 233604 ||  || — || September 15, 2007 || Kitt Peak || Spacewatch || — || align=right | 4.3 km || 
|-id=605 bgcolor=#fefefe
| 233605 ||  || — || September 4, 2007 || Catalina || CSS || V || align=right | 1.2 km || 
|-id=606 bgcolor=#d6d6d6
| 233606 ||  || — || September 19, 2007 || Kitt Peak || Spacewatch || — || align=right | 3.1 km || 
|-id=607 bgcolor=#E9E9E9
| 233607 ||  || — || September 19, 2007 || Kitt Peak || Spacewatch || — || align=right | 1.5 km || 
|-id=608 bgcolor=#d6d6d6
| 233608 ||  || — || September 30, 2007 || Kitt Peak || Spacewatch || — || align=right | 3.3 km || 
|-id=609 bgcolor=#fefefe
| 233609 ||  || — || October 6, 2007 || La Sagra || OAM Obs. || ERI || align=right | 2.5 km || 
|-id=610 bgcolor=#E9E9E9
| 233610 ||  || — || October 5, 2007 || Kitt Peak || Spacewatch || — || align=right | 2.9 km || 
|-id=611 bgcolor=#E9E9E9
| 233611 ||  || — || October 8, 2007 || Mount Lemmon || Mount Lemmon Survey || — || align=right | 1.8 km || 
|-id=612 bgcolor=#d6d6d6
| 233612 ||  || — || October 8, 2007 || Kitt Peak || Spacewatch || — || align=right | 2.8 km || 
|-id=613 bgcolor=#d6d6d6
| 233613 ||  || — || October 6, 2007 || Socorro || LINEAR || EOS || align=right | 3.0 km || 
|-id=614 bgcolor=#E9E9E9
| 233614 ||  || — || October 9, 2007 || Socorro || LINEAR || — || align=right | 3.2 km || 
|-id=615 bgcolor=#fefefe
| 233615 ||  || — || October 9, 2007 || Socorro || LINEAR || — || align=right | 2.4 km || 
|-id=616 bgcolor=#d6d6d6
| 233616 ||  || — || October 12, 2007 || Socorro || LINEAR || — || align=right | 4.1 km || 
|-id=617 bgcolor=#d6d6d6
| 233617 ||  || — || October 13, 2007 || Socorro || LINEAR || — || align=right | 3.5 km || 
|-id=618 bgcolor=#E9E9E9
| 233618 ||  || — || October 8, 2007 || Mount Lemmon || Mount Lemmon Survey || — || align=right | 2.3 km || 
|-id=619 bgcolor=#E9E9E9
| 233619 ||  || — || October 8, 2007 || Mount Lemmon || Mount Lemmon Survey || — || align=right | 3.2 km || 
|-id=620 bgcolor=#d6d6d6
| 233620 ||  || — || October 9, 2007 || Kitt Peak || Spacewatch || — || align=right | 3.3 km || 
|-id=621 bgcolor=#d6d6d6
| 233621 ||  || — || October 9, 2007 || Mount Lemmon || Mount Lemmon Survey || — || align=right | 4.6 km || 
|-id=622 bgcolor=#d6d6d6
| 233622 ||  || — || October 9, 2007 || Mount Lemmon || Mount Lemmon Survey || — || align=right | 2.5 km || 
|-id=623 bgcolor=#E9E9E9
| 233623 ||  || — || October 8, 2007 || Catalina || CSS || — || align=right | 3.7 km || 
|-id=624 bgcolor=#d6d6d6
| 233624 ||  || — || October 9, 2007 || Kitt Peak || Spacewatch || HYG || align=right | 3.9 km || 
|-id=625 bgcolor=#E9E9E9
| 233625 ||  || — || October 11, 2007 || Kitt Peak || Spacewatch || — || align=right | 2.4 km || 
|-id=626 bgcolor=#E9E9E9
| 233626 ||  || — || October 14, 2007 || Mount Lemmon || Mount Lemmon Survey || — || align=right | 2.6 km || 
|-id=627 bgcolor=#d6d6d6
| 233627 ||  || — || October 9, 2007 || Socorro || LINEAR || — || align=right | 4.3 km || 
|-id=628 bgcolor=#d6d6d6
| 233628 ||  || — || October 12, 2007 || Catalina || CSS || TEL || align=right | 2.3 km || 
|-id=629 bgcolor=#d6d6d6
| 233629 ||  || — || October 24, 2007 || Mount Lemmon || Mount Lemmon Survey || ELF || align=right | 6.7 km || 
|-id=630 bgcolor=#E9E9E9
| 233630 ||  || — || October 30, 2007 || Mount Lemmon || Mount Lemmon Survey || — || align=right | 1.6 km || 
|-id=631 bgcolor=#E9E9E9
| 233631 ||  || — || October 31, 2007 || Mount Lemmon || Mount Lemmon Survey || ADE || align=right | 4.4 km || 
|-id=632 bgcolor=#d6d6d6
| 233632 ||  || — || October 30, 2007 || Catalina || CSS || TRP || align=right | 5.1 km || 
|-id=633 bgcolor=#E9E9E9
| 233633 ||  || — || November 1, 2007 || Kitt Peak || Spacewatch || — || align=right | 4.0 km || 
|-id=634 bgcolor=#d6d6d6
| 233634 ||  || — || November 2, 2007 || Catalina || CSS || — || align=right | 4.8 km || 
|-id=635 bgcolor=#d6d6d6
| 233635 ||  || — || November 2, 2007 || Calvin-Rehoboth || L. A. Molnar || — || align=right | 5.7 km || 
|-id=636 bgcolor=#d6d6d6
| 233636 ||  || — || November 2, 2007 || Kitt Peak || Spacewatch || — || align=right | 4.9 km || 
|-id=637 bgcolor=#d6d6d6
| 233637 ||  || — || November 4, 2007 || Socorro || LINEAR || — || align=right | 6.0 km || 
|-id=638 bgcolor=#d6d6d6
| 233638 ||  || — || November 9, 2007 || Kitt Peak || Spacewatch || — || align=right | 4.6 km || 
|-id=639 bgcolor=#d6d6d6
| 233639 ||  || — || November 18, 2007 || Mount Lemmon || Mount Lemmon Survey || — || align=right | 6.5 km || 
|-id=640 bgcolor=#E9E9E9
| 233640 ||  || — || January 10, 2008 || Mount Lemmon || Mount Lemmon Survey || MRX || align=right | 1.3 km || 
|-id=641 bgcolor=#E9E9E9
| 233641 ||  || — || April 24, 2008 || Kitt Peak || Spacewatch || ADE || align=right | 3.7 km || 
|-id=642 bgcolor=#fefefe
| 233642 ||  || — || May 26, 2008 || Kitt Peak || Spacewatch || — || align=right | 2.3 km || 
|-id=643 bgcolor=#d6d6d6
| 233643 ||  || — || June 27, 2008 || La Sagra || OAM Obs. || — || align=right | 7.3 km || 
|-id=644 bgcolor=#E9E9E9
| 233644 ||  || — || July 29, 2008 || Črni Vrh || Črni Vrh || — || align=right | 3.4 km || 
|-id=645 bgcolor=#d6d6d6
| 233645 ||  || — || July 28, 2008 || Hibiscus || S. F. Hönig, N. Teamo || — || align=right | 5.0 km || 
|-id=646 bgcolor=#d6d6d6
| 233646 ||  || — || July 30, 2008 || Mount Lemmon || Mount Lemmon Survey || THM || align=right | 2.9 km || 
|-id=647 bgcolor=#fefefe
| 233647 ||  || — || August 3, 2008 || Hibiscus || S. F. Hönig, N. Teamo || NYS || align=right data-sort-value="0.99" | 990 m || 
|-id=648 bgcolor=#fefefe
| 233648 ||  || — || August 6, 2008 || La Sagra || OAM Obs. || V || align=right data-sort-value="0.98" | 980 m || 
|-id=649 bgcolor=#d6d6d6
| 233649 ||  || — || August 10, 2008 || Črni Vrh || Črni Vrh || — || align=right | 5.6 km || 
|-id=650 bgcolor=#fefefe
| 233650 ||  || — || August 6, 2008 || La Sagra || OAM Obs. || — || align=right | 1.2 km || 
|-id=651 bgcolor=#d6d6d6
| 233651 ||  || — || August 6, 2008 || Siding Spring || SSS || EUP || align=right | 4.3 km || 
|-id=652 bgcolor=#d6d6d6
| 233652 ||  || — || August 3, 2008 || Siding Spring || SSS || — || align=right | 4.2 km || 
|-id=653 bgcolor=#d6d6d6
| 233653 Rether || 2008 QR ||  || August 23, 2008 || Wildberg || R. Apitzsch || EUP || align=right | 6.2 km || 
|-id=654 bgcolor=#fefefe
| 233654 ||  || — || August 24, 2008 || Marly || P. Kocher || NYS || align=right | 1.00 km || 
|-id=655 bgcolor=#fefefe
| 233655 ||  || — || August 25, 2008 || La Sagra || OAM Obs. || MAS || align=right data-sort-value="0.99" | 990 m || 
|-id=656 bgcolor=#E9E9E9
| 233656 ||  || — || August 30, 2008 || Hibiscus || S. F. Hönig, N. Teamo || — || align=right | 1.6 km || 
|-id=657 bgcolor=#d6d6d6
| 233657 ||  || — || August 26, 2008 || Socorro || LINEAR || BRA || align=right | 2.2 km || 
|-id=658 bgcolor=#E9E9E9
| 233658 ||  || — || August 30, 2008 || La Sagra || OAM Obs. || GEF || align=right | 2.5 km || 
|-id=659 bgcolor=#fefefe
| 233659 ||  || — || August 30, 2008 || La Sagra || OAM Obs. || V || align=right | 1.2 km || 
|-id=660 bgcolor=#E9E9E9
| 233660 ||  || — || August 27, 2008 || Observatoire des Pises|Pises || Pises Obs. || — || align=right | 3.3 km || 
|-id=661 bgcolor=#fefefe
| 233661 Alytus ||  ||  || August 31, 2008 || Moletai || K. Černis, E. Černis || — || align=right | 1.1 km || 
|-id=662 bgcolor=#d6d6d6
| 233662 ||  || — || August 23, 2008 || Siding Spring || SSS || — || align=right | 6.3 km || 
|-id=663 bgcolor=#E9E9E9
| 233663 ||  || — || August 23, 2008 || Kitt Peak || Spacewatch || — || align=right | 3.3 km || 
|-id=664 bgcolor=#fefefe
| 233664 ||  || — || September 2, 2008 || Kitt Peak || Spacewatch || — || align=right data-sort-value="0.96" | 960 m || 
|-id=665 bgcolor=#fefefe
| 233665 ||  || — || September 3, 2008 || Kitt Peak || Spacewatch || — || align=right | 1.2 km || 
|-id=666 bgcolor=#E9E9E9
| 233666 ||  || — || September 4, 2008 || Socorro || LINEAR || — || align=right | 3.0 km || 
|-id=667 bgcolor=#E9E9E9
| 233667 ||  || — || September 5, 2008 || Junk Bond || D. Healy || — || align=right | 2.2 km || 
|-id=668 bgcolor=#E9E9E9
| 233668 ||  || — || September 8, 2008 || Dauban || F. Kugel || — || align=right | 2.5 km || 
|-id=669 bgcolor=#fefefe
| 233669 ||  || — || September 2, 2008 || Kitt Peak || Spacewatch || — || align=right | 1.2 km || 
|-id=670 bgcolor=#d6d6d6
| 233670 ||  || — || September 2, 2008 || Kitt Peak || Spacewatch || 7:4 || align=right | 6.5 km || 
|-id=671 bgcolor=#d6d6d6
| 233671 ||  || — || September 2, 2008 || Kitt Peak || Spacewatch || — || align=right | 2.8 km || 
|-id=672 bgcolor=#d6d6d6
| 233672 ||  || — || September 2, 2008 || Kitt Peak || Spacewatch || — || align=right | 2.5 km || 
|-id=673 bgcolor=#E9E9E9
| 233673 ||  || — || September 2, 2008 || Kitt Peak || Spacewatch || — || align=right | 1.4 km || 
|-id=674 bgcolor=#fefefe
| 233674 ||  || — || September 3, 2008 || Kitt Peak || Spacewatch || — || align=right data-sort-value="0.97" | 970 m || 
|-id=675 bgcolor=#E9E9E9
| 233675 ||  || — || September 4, 2008 || Kitt Peak || Spacewatch || — || align=right | 1.9 km || 
|-id=676 bgcolor=#E9E9E9
| 233676 ||  || — || September 4, 2008 || Kitt Peak || Spacewatch || — || align=right | 2.5 km || 
|-id=677 bgcolor=#d6d6d6
| 233677 ||  || — || September 5, 2008 || Kitt Peak || Spacewatch || — || align=right | 5.0 km || 
|-id=678 bgcolor=#fefefe
| 233678 ||  || — || September 6, 2008 || Catalina || CSS || NYS || align=right data-sort-value="0.76" | 760 m || 
|-id=679 bgcolor=#E9E9E9
| 233679 ||  || — || September 3, 2008 || La Sagra || OAM Obs. || — || align=right | 2.3 km || 
|-id=680 bgcolor=#fefefe
| 233680 ||  || — || September 6, 2008 || Kitt Peak || Spacewatch || NYS || align=right | 1.0 km || 
|-id=681 bgcolor=#d6d6d6
| 233681 ||  || — || September 7, 2008 || Mount Lemmon || Mount Lemmon Survey || EOS || align=right | 4.8 km || 
|-id=682 bgcolor=#d6d6d6
| 233682 ||  || — || September 3, 2008 || Kitt Peak || Spacewatch || THM || align=right | 2.5 km || 
|-id=683 bgcolor=#C2FFFF
| 233683 ||  || — || September 5, 2008 || Kitt Peak || Spacewatch || L4ERY || align=right | 10 km || 
|-id=684 bgcolor=#d6d6d6
| 233684 ||  || — || September 7, 2008 || Mount Lemmon || Mount Lemmon Survey || — || align=right | 5.8 km || 
|-id=685 bgcolor=#fefefe
| 233685 ||  || — || September 2, 2008 || Kitt Peak || Spacewatch || MAS || align=right | 1.0 km || 
|-id=686 bgcolor=#d6d6d6
| 233686 ||  || — || September 7, 2008 || Mount Lemmon || Mount Lemmon Survey || KAR || align=right | 1.5 km || 
|-id=687 bgcolor=#fefefe
| 233687 ||  || — || September 6, 2008 || Catalina || CSS || FLO || align=right | 1.1 km || 
|-id=688 bgcolor=#E9E9E9
| 233688 ||  || — || September 4, 2008 || Socorro || LINEAR || — || align=right | 3.1 km || 
|-id=689 bgcolor=#E9E9E9
| 233689 ||  || — || September 22, 2008 || Socorro || LINEAR || — || align=right | 2.1 km || 
|-id=690 bgcolor=#E9E9E9
| 233690 ||  || — || September 22, 2008 || Socorro || LINEAR || EUN || align=right | 1.9 km || 
|-id=691 bgcolor=#d6d6d6
| 233691 ||  || — || September 22, 2008 || Socorro || LINEAR || — || align=right | 3.9 km || 
|-id=692 bgcolor=#E9E9E9
| 233692 ||  || — || September 20, 2008 || Mount Lemmon || Mount Lemmon Survey || — || align=right | 3.3 km || 
|-id=693 bgcolor=#E9E9E9
| 233693 ||  || — || September 19, 2008 || Kitt Peak || Spacewatch || — || align=right | 2.5 km || 
|-id=694 bgcolor=#E9E9E9
| 233694 ||  || — || September 19, 2008 || Kitt Peak || Spacewatch || — || align=right | 2.5 km || 
|-id=695 bgcolor=#E9E9E9
| 233695 ||  || — || September 19, 2008 || Kitt Peak || Spacewatch || — || align=right | 3.0 km || 
|-id=696 bgcolor=#E9E9E9
| 233696 ||  || — || September 20, 2008 || Mount Lemmon || Mount Lemmon Survey || — || align=right | 1.9 km || 
|-id=697 bgcolor=#fefefe
| 233697 ||  || — || September 20, 2008 || Catalina || CSS || MAS || align=right | 1.1 km || 
|-id=698 bgcolor=#fefefe
| 233698 ||  || — || September 20, 2008 || Catalina || CSS || — || align=right | 1.0 km || 
|-id=699 bgcolor=#d6d6d6
| 233699 ||  || — || September 20, 2008 || Kitt Peak || Spacewatch || — || align=right | 3.5 km || 
|-id=700 bgcolor=#fefefe
| 233700 ||  || — || September 20, 2008 || Mount Lemmon || Mount Lemmon Survey || — || align=right | 1.3 km || 
|}

233701–233800 

|-bgcolor=#fefefe
| 233701 ||  || — || September 20, 2008 || Mount Lemmon || Mount Lemmon Survey || — || align=right | 1.2 km || 
|-id=702 bgcolor=#E9E9E9
| 233702 ||  || — || September 20, 2008 || Mount Lemmon || Mount Lemmon Survey || HEN || align=right | 1.3 km || 
|-id=703 bgcolor=#E9E9E9
| 233703 ||  || — || September 20, 2008 || Kitt Peak || Spacewatch || — || align=right | 1.2 km || 
|-id=704 bgcolor=#fefefe
| 233704 ||  || — || September 21, 2008 || Catalina || CSS || FLO || align=right data-sort-value="0.86" | 860 m || 
|-id=705 bgcolor=#E9E9E9
| 233705 ||  || — || September 21, 2008 || Mount Lemmon || Mount Lemmon Survey || EUN || align=right | 1.9 km || 
|-id=706 bgcolor=#E9E9E9
| 233706 ||  || — || September 23, 2008 || Catalina || CSS || — || align=right | 3.6 km || 
|-id=707 bgcolor=#fefefe
| 233707 Alfons ||  ||  || September 26, 2008 || Wildberg || R. Apitzsch || — || align=right | 1.2 km || 
|-id=708 bgcolor=#E9E9E9
| 233708 ||  || — || September 21, 2008 || Kitt Peak || Spacewatch || — || align=right | 1.3 km || 
|-id=709 bgcolor=#E9E9E9
| 233709 ||  || — || September 21, 2008 || Kitt Peak || Spacewatch || — || align=right | 2.9 km || 
|-id=710 bgcolor=#E9E9E9
| 233710 ||  || — || September 21, 2008 || Kitt Peak || Spacewatch || — || align=right | 3.0 km || 
|-id=711 bgcolor=#E9E9E9
| 233711 ||  || — || September 21, 2008 || Kitt Peak || Spacewatch || — || align=right | 1.9 km || 
|-id=712 bgcolor=#E9E9E9
| 233712 ||  || — || September 21, 2008 || Kitt Peak || Spacewatch || — || align=right | 2.0 km || 
|-id=713 bgcolor=#fefefe
| 233713 ||  || — || September 21, 2008 || Siding Spring || SSS || SVE || align=right | 3.4 km || 
|-id=714 bgcolor=#d6d6d6
| 233714 ||  || — || September 22, 2008 || Kitt Peak || Spacewatch || — || align=right | 3.2 km || 
|-id=715 bgcolor=#E9E9E9
| 233715 ||  || — || September 22, 2008 || Kitt Peak || Spacewatch || — || align=right | 1.6 km || 
|-id=716 bgcolor=#E9E9E9
| 233716 ||  || — || September 22, 2008 || Kitt Peak || Spacewatch || WIT || align=right | 1.3 km || 
|-id=717 bgcolor=#fefefe
| 233717 ||  || — || September 22, 2008 || Kitt Peak || Spacewatch || — || align=right | 1.2 km || 
|-id=718 bgcolor=#E9E9E9
| 233718 ||  || — || September 22, 2008 || Kitt Peak || Spacewatch || HEN || align=right | 1.8 km || 
|-id=719 bgcolor=#fefefe
| 233719 ||  || — || September 23, 2008 || Catalina || CSS || — || align=right | 1.2 km || 
|-id=720 bgcolor=#d6d6d6
| 233720 ||  || — || September 24, 2008 || Mount Lemmon || Mount Lemmon Survey || THM || align=right | 3.4 km || 
|-id=721 bgcolor=#E9E9E9
| 233721 ||  || — || September 24, 2008 || Mount Lemmon || Mount Lemmon Survey || GEF || align=right | 2.1 km || 
|-id=722 bgcolor=#fefefe
| 233722 ||  || — || September 30, 2008 || Sandlot || G. Hug || V || align=right | 1.0 km || 
|-id=723 bgcolor=#E9E9E9
| 233723 ||  || — || September 22, 2008 || Socorro || LINEAR || MRX || align=right | 1.5 km || 
|-id=724 bgcolor=#E9E9E9
| 233724 ||  || — || September 22, 2008 || Socorro || LINEAR || HEN || align=right | 1.5 km || 
|-id=725 bgcolor=#fefefe
| 233725 ||  || — || September 24, 2008 || Socorro || LINEAR || FLO || align=right | 1.0 km || 
|-id=726 bgcolor=#fefefe
| 233726 ||  || — || September 28, 2008 || Socorro || LINEAR || V || align=right data-sort-value="0.87" | 870 m || 
|-id=727 bgcolor=#E9E9E9
| 233727 ||  || — || September 28, 2008 || Socorro || LINEAR || — || align=right | 3.8 km || 
|-id=728 bgcolor=#E9E9E9
| 233728 ||  || — || September 25, 2008 || Kitt Peak || Spacewatch || — || align=right | 1.5 km || 
|-id=729 bgcolor=#E9E9E9
| 233729 ||  || — || September 25, 2008 || Kitt Peak || Spacewatch || — || align=right | 3.6 km || 
|-id=730 bgcolor=#E9E9E9
| 233730 ||  || — || September 25, 2008 || Kitt Peak || Spacewatch || — || align=right | 2.5 km || 
|-id=731 bgcolor=#fefefe
| 233731 ||  || — || September 28, 2008 || Mount Lemmon || Mount Lemmon Survey || — || align=right | 1.1 km || 
|-id=732 bgcolor=#d6d6d6
| 233732 ||  || — || September 29, 2008 || La Sagra || OAM Obs. || — || align=right | 3.7 km || 
|-id=733 bgcolor=#E9E9E9
| 233733 ||  || — || September 29, 2008 || Kitt Peak || Spacewatch || — || align=right | 1.3 km || 
|-id=734 bgcolor=#d6d6d6
| 233734 ||  || — || September 29, 2008 || Kitt Peak || Spacewatch || — || align=right | 3.4 km || 
|-id=735 bgcolor=#E9E9E9
| 233735 ||  || — || September 20, 2008 || Kitt Peak || Spacewatch || HEN || align=right | 1.1 km || 
|-id=736 bgcolor=#d6d6d6
| 233736 ||  || — || September 21, 2008 || Mount Lemmon || Mount Lemmon Survey || KOR || align=right | 1.7 km || 
|-id=737 bgcolor=#E9E9E9
| 233737 ||  || — || September 21, 2008 || Catalina || CSS || — || align=right | 3.2 km || 
|-id=738 bgcolor=#E9E9E9
| 233738 ||  || — || September 22, 2008 || Kitt Peak || Spacewatch || AGN || align=right | 1.8 km || 
|-id=739 bgcolor=#d6d6d6
| 233739 ||  || — || September 22, 2008 || Kitt Peak || Spacewatch || — || align=right | 3.1 km || 
|-id=740 bgcolor=#E9E9E9
| 233740 ||  || — || September 21, 2008 || Catalina || CSS || — || align=right | 1.9 km || 
|-id=741 bgcolor=#E9E9E9
| 233741 ||  || — || September 29, 2008 || Kitt Peak || Spacewatch || — || align=right | 2.0 km || 
|-id=742 bgcolor=#E9E9E9
| 233742 ||  || — || September 29, 2008 || Catalina || CSS || — || align=right | 2.8 km || 
|-id=743 bgcolor=#d6d6d6
| 233743 ||  || — || September 29, 2008 || Mount Lemmon || Mount Lemmon Survey || — || align=right | 3.6 km || 
|-id=744 bgcolor=#d6d6d6
| 233744 ||  || — || September 20, 2008 || Kitt Peak || Spacewatch || — || align=right | 3.4 km || 
|-id=745 bgcolor=#E9E9E9
| 233745 ||  || — || September 23, 2008 || Catalina || CSS || — || align=right | 3.2 km || 
|-id=746 bgcolor=#fefefe
| 233746 ||  || — || September 24, 2008 || Mount Lemmon || Mount Lemmon Survey || FLO || align=right data-sort-value="0.78" | 780 m || 
|-id=747 bgcolor=#d6d6d6
| 233747 ||  || — || September 24, 2008 || Mount Lemmon || Mount Lemmon Survey || — || align=right | 3.6 km || 
|-id=748 bgcolor=#fefefe
| 233748 ||  || — || September 29, 2008 || Catalina || CSS || V || align=right data-sort-value="0.86" | 860 m || 
|-id=749 bgcolor=#E9E9E9
| 233749 ||  || — || October 2, 2008 || Wrightwood || J. W. Young || — || align=right | 2.0 km || 
|-id=750 bgcolor=#E9E9E9
| 233750 ||  || — || October 1, 2008 || La Sagra || OAM Obs. || — || align=right | 3.2 km || 
|-id=751 bgcolor=#fefefe
| 233751 ||  || — || October 3, 2008 || La Sagra || OAM Obs. || — || align=right | 1.4 km || 
|-id=752 bgcolor=#d6d6d6
| 233752 ||  || — || October 6, 2008 || Goodricke-Pigott || R. A. Tucker || — || align=right | 4.0 km || 
|-id=753 bgcolor=#d6d6d6
| 233753 ||  || — || October 1, 2008 || Mount Lemmon || Mount Lemmon Survey || KAR || align=right | 1.2 km || 
|-id=754 bgcolor=#d6d6d6
| 233754 ||  || — || October 1, 2008 || Mount Lemmon || Mount Lemmon Survey || — || align=right | 3.7 km || 
|-id=755 bgcolor=#d6d6d6
| 233755 ||  || — || October 1, 2008 || Mount Lemmon || Mount Lemmon Survey || THM || align=right | 3.4 km || 
|-id=756 bgcolor=#E9E9E9
| 233756 ||  || — || October 2, 2008 || Catalina || CSS || HEN || align=right | 1.4 km || 
|-id=757 bgcolor=#d6d6d6
| 233757 ||  || — || October 8, 2008 || Socorro || LINEAR || EUP || align=right | 5.6 km || 
|-id=758 bgcolor=#E9E9E9
| 233758 ||  || — || October 1, 2008 || Mount Lemmon || Mount Lemmon Survey || GEF || align=right | 1.5 km || 
|-id=759 bgcolor=#d6d6d6
| 233759 ||  || — || October 2, 2008 || Kitt Peak || Spacewatch || THM || align=right | 3.9 km || 
|-id=760 bgcolor=#E9E9E9
| 233760 ||  || — || October 2, 2008 || Kitt Peak || Spacewatch || MIS || align=right | 3.0 km || 
|-id=761 bgcolor=#E9E9E9
| 233761 ||  || — || October 2, 2008 || Kitt Peak || Spacewatch || — || align=right | 2.6 km || 
|-id=762 bgcolor=#E9E9E9
| 233762 ||  || — || October 2, 2008 || Kitt Peak || Spacewatch || — || align=right | 3.8 km || 
|-id=763 bgcolor=#d6d6d6
| 233763 ||  || — || October 2, 2008 || Kitt Peak || Spacewatch || — || align=right | 4.5 km || 
|-id=764 bgcolor=#E9E9E9
| 233764 ||  || — || October 3, 2008 || Kitt Peak || Spacewatch || — || align=right | 2.9 km || 
|-id=765 bgcolor=#fefefe
| 233765 ||  || — || October 6, 2008 || Kitt Peak || Spacewatch || MAS || align=right | 1.1 km || 
|-id=766 bgcolor=#E9E9E9
| 233766 ||  || — || October 6, 2008 || Kitt Peak || Spacewatch || — || align=right | 1.2 km || 
|-id=767 bgcolor=#d6d6d6
| 233767 ||  || — || October 6, 2008 || Catalina || CSS || EOS || align=right | 2.9 km || 
|-id=768 bgcolor=#d6d6d6
| 233768 ||  || — || October 6, 2008 || Catalina || CSS || — || align=right | 3.8 km || 
|-id=769 bgcolor=#E9E9E9
| 233769 ||  || — || October 6, 2008 || Kitt Peak || Spacewatch || — || align=right | 3.4 km || 
|-id=770 bgcolor=#E9E9E9
| 233770 ||  || — || October 7, 2008 || Mount Lemmon || Mount Lemmon Survey || MRX || align=right | 1.7 km || 
|-id=771 bgcolor=#E9E9E9
| 233771 ||  || — || October 8, 2008 || Mount Lemmon || Mount Lemmon Survey || — || align=right | 2.3 km || 
|-id=772 bgcolor=#fefefe
| 233772 ||  || — || October 8, 2008 || Mount Lemmon || Mount Lemmon Survey || — || align=right | 1.6 km || 
|-id=773 bgcolor=#C2FFFF
| 233773 ||  || — || October 9, 2008 || Mount Lemmon || Mount Lemmon Survey || L4 || align=right | 8.2 km || 
|-id=774 bgcolor=#d6d6d6
| 233774 ||  || — || October 5, 2008 || La Sagra || OAM Obs. || — || align=right | 4.3 km || 
|-id=775 bgcolor=#E9E9E9
| 233775 ||  || — || October 11, 2008 || Hibiscus || N. Teamo || AER || align=right | 1.8 km || 
|-id=776 bgcolor=#E9E9E9
| 233776 ||  || — || October 1, 2008 || Kitt Peak || Spacewatch || — || align=right | 1.6 km || 
|-id=777 bgcolor=#fefefe
| 233777 ||  || — || October 8, 2008 || Kitt Peak || Spacewatch || MAS || align=right data-sort-value="0.88" | 880 m || 
|-id=778 bgcolor=#d6d6d6
| 233778 ||  || — || October 1, 2008 || Catalina || CSS || 3:2 || align=right | 4.8 km || 
|-id=779 bgcolor=#d6d6d6
| 233779 ||  || — || October 2, 2008 || Kitt Peak || Spacewatch || — || align=right | 3.9 km || 
|-id=780 bgcolor=#d6d6d6
| 233780 ||  || — || October 10, 2008 || Catalina || CSS || — || align=right | 5.4 km || 
|-id=781 bgcolor=#d6d6d6
| 233781 ||  || — || October 3, 2008 || Mount Lemmon || Mount Lemmon Survey || — || align=right | 3.0 km || 
|-id=782 bgcolor=#E9E9E9
| 233782 ||  || — || October 10, 2008 || Mount Lemmon || Mount Lemmon Survey || EUN || align=right | 1.8 km || 
|-id=783 bgcolor=#d6d6d6
| 233783 ||  || — || October 4, 2008 || Catalina || CSS || — || align=right | 4.9 km || 
|-id=784 bgcolor=#E9E9E9
| 233784 ||  || — || October 21, 2008 || Goodricke-Pigott || R. A. Tucker || — || align=right | 3.6 km || 
|-id=785 bgcolor=#fefefe
| 233785 ||  || — || October 23, 2008 || Bergisch Gladbach || W. Bickel || — || align=right | 1.3 km || 
|-id=786 bgcolor=#E9E9E9
| 233786 ||  || — || October 21, 2008 || Mount Lemmon || Mount Lemmon Survey || — || align=right | 3.1 km || 
|-id=787 bgcolor=#E9E9E9
| 233787 ||  || — || October 18, 2008 || Kitt Peak || Spacewatch || — || align=right | 2.1 km || 
|-id=788 bgcolor=#fefefe
| 233788 ||  || — || October 18, 2008 || Kitt Peak || Spacewatch || MAS || align=right data-sort-value="0.90" | 900 m || 
|-id=789 bgcolor=#E9E9E9
| 233789 ||  || — || October 19, 2008 || Kitt Peak || Spacewatch || HEN || align=right | 1.4 km || 
|-id=790 bgcolor=#C2FFFF
| 233790 ||  || — || October 20, 2008 || Kitt Peak || Spacewatch || L4 || align=right | 11 km || 
|-id=791 bgcolor=#d6d6d6
| 233791 ||  || — || October 20, 2008 || Kitt Peak || Spacewatch || — || align=right | 2.6 km || 
|-id=792 bgcolor=#E9E9E9
| 233792 ||  || — || October 20, 2008 || Kitt Peak || Spacewatch || — || align=right | 2.6 km || 
|-id=793 bgcolor=#d6d6d6
| 233793 ||  || — || October 20, 2008 || Kitt Peak || Spacewatch || KOR || align=right | 1.5 km || 
|-id=794 bgcolor=#d6d6d6
| 233794 ||  || — || October 21, 2008 || Kitt Peak || Spacewatch || KOR || align=right | 1.9 km || 
|-id=795 bgcolor=#d6d6d6
| 233795 ||  || — || October 21, 2008 || Kitt Peak || Spacewatch || — || align=right | 4.8 km || 
|-id=796 bgcolor=#d6d6d6
| 233796 ||  || — || October 21, 2008 || Kitt Peak || Spacewatch || — || align=right | 3.4 km || 
|-id=797 bgcolor=#fefefe
| 233797 ||  || — || October 22, 2008 || Kitt Peak || Spacewatch || MAS || align=right data-sort-value="0.91" | 910 m || 
|-id=798 bgcolor=#E9E9E9
| 233798 ||  || — || October 28, 2008 || Kachina || J. Hobart || — || align=right | 1.9 km || 
|-id=799 bgcolor=#d6d6d6
| 233799 ||  || — || October 22, 2008 || Kitt Peak || Spacewatch || 628 || align=right | 2.6 km || 
|-id=800 bgcolor=#E9E9E9
| 233800 ||  || — || October 22, 2008 || Kitt Peak || Spacewatch || — || align=right | 1.9 km || 
|}

233801–233900 

|-bgcolor=#d6d6d6
| 233801 ||  || — || October 22, 2008 || Kitt Peak || Spacewatch || — || align=right | 3.9 km || 
|-id=802 bgcolor=#d6d6d6
| 233802 ||  || — || October 22, 2008 || Kitt Peak || Spacewatch || HYG || align=right | 3.4 km || 
|-id=803 bgcolor=#fefefe
| 233803 ||  || — || October 22, 2008 || Kitt Peak || Spacewatch || V || align=right data-sort-value="0.97" | 970 m || 
|-id=804 bgcolor=#fefefe
| 233804 ||  || — || October 22, 2008 || Kitt Peak || Spacewatch || FLO || align=right data-sort-value="0.88" | 880 m || 
|-id=805 bgcolor=#d6d6d6
| 233805 ||  || — || October 22, 2008 || Kitt Peak || Spacewatch || THM || align=right | 4.2 km || 
|-id=806 bgcolor=#E9E9E9
| 233806 ||  || — || October 23, 2008 || Kitt Peak || Spacewatch || HOF || align=right | 3.4 km || 
|-id=807 bgcolor=#E9E9E9
| 233807 ||  || — || October 23, 2008 || Kitt Peak || Spacewatch || AST || align=right | 3.0 km || 
|-id=808 bgcolor=#E9E9E9
| 233808 ||  || — || October 23, 2008 || Kitt Peak || Spacewatch || — || align=right | 1.9 km || 
|-id=809 bgcolor=#d6d6d6
| 233809 ||  || — || October 23, 2008 || Kitt Peak || Spacewatch || — || align=right | 5.2 km || 
|-id=810 bgcolor=#E9E9E9
| 233810 ||  || — || October 23, 2008 || Kitt Peak || Spacewatch || HEN || align=right | 1.5 km || 
|-id=811 bgcolor=#E9E9E9
| 233811 ||  || — || October 23, 2008 || Mount Lemmon || Mount Lemmon Survey || — || align=right | 1.5 km || 
|-id=812 bgcolor=#fefefe
| 233812 ||  || — || October 24, 2008 || Kitt Peak || Spacewatch || MAS || align=right data-sort-value="0.89" | 890 m || 
|-id=813 bgcolor=#E9E9E9
| 233813 ||  || — || October 24, 2008 || Kitt Peak || Spacewatch || — || align=right | 2.7 km || 
|-id=814 bgcolor=#E9E9E9
| 233814 ||  || — || October 24, 2008 || Catalina || CSS || — || align=right | 3.9 km || 
|-id=815 bgcolor=#fefefe
| 233815 ||  || — || October 24, 2008 || Kitt Peak || Spacewatch || MAS || align=right | 1.1 km || 
|-id=816 bgcolor=#d6d6d6
| 233816 ||  || — || October 24, 2008 || Mount Lemmon || Mount Lemmon Survey || KOR || align=right | 1.7 km || 
|-id=817 bgcolor=#d6d6d6
| 233817 ||  || — || October 24, 2008 || Kitt Peak || Spacewatch || — || align=right | 3.5 km || 
|-id=818 bgcolor=#E9E9E9
| 233818 ||  || — || October 25, 2008 || Catalina || CSS || — || align=right | 2.5 km || 
|-id=819 bgcolor=#E9E9E9
| 233819 ||  || — || October 25, 2008 || Catalina || CSS || AGN || align=right | 1.8 km || 
|-id=820 bgcolor=#E9E9E9
| 233820 ||  || — || October 28, 2008 || Socorro || LINEAR || — || align=right | 3.4 km || 
|-id=821 bgcolor=#fefefe
| 233821 ||  || — || October 28, 2008 || Socorro || LINEAR || FLO || align=right data-sort-value="0.73" | 730 m || 
|-id=822 bgcolor=#E9E9E9
| 233822 ||  || — || October 28, 2008 || Socorro || LINEAR || — || align=right | 3.5 km || 
|-id=823 bgcolor=#d6d6d6
| 233823 ||  || — || October 23, 2008 || Kitt Peak || Spacewatch || — || align=right | 3.6 km || 
|-id=824 bgcolor=#fefefe
| 233824 ||  || — || October 23, 2008 || Mount Lemmon || Mount Lemmon Survey || NYS || align=right data-sort-value="0.92" | 920 m || 
|-id=825 bgcolor=#E9E9E9
| 233825 ||  || — || October 26, 2008 || Kitt Peak || Spacewatch || — || align=right | 2.9 km || 
|-id=826 bgcolor=#d6d6d6
| 233826 ||  || — || October 26, 2008 || Catalina || CSS || — || align=right | 4.0 km || 
|-id=827 bgcolor=#C2FFFF
| 233827 ||  || — || October 26, 2008 || Mount Lemmon || Mount Lemmon Survey || L4 || align=right | 13 km || 
|-id=828 bgcolor=#E9E9E9
| 233828 ||  || — || October 26, 2008 || Catalina || CSS || MAR || align=right | 1.8 km || 
|-id=829 bgcolor=#d6d6d6
| 233829 ||  || — || October 26, 2008 || Kitt Peak || Spacewatch || — || align=right | 2.9 km || 
|-id=830 bgcolor=#d6d6d6
| 233830 ||  || — || October 26, 2008 || Kitt Peak || Spacewatch || KOR || align=right | 1.8 km || 
|-id=831 bgcolor=#E9E9E9
| 233831 ||  || — || October 27, 2008 || Kitt Peak || Spacewatch || — || align=right | 1.5 km || 
|-id=832 bgcolor=#E9E9E9
| 233832 ||  || — || October 27, 2008 || Kitt Peak || Spacewatch || — || align=right | 2.2 km || 
|-id=833 bgcolor=#E9E9E9
| 233833 ||  || — || October 28, 2008 || Kitt Peak || Spacewatch || — || align=right | 2.5 km || 
|-id=834 bgcolor=#E9E9E9
| 233834 ||  || — || October 28, 2008 || Kitt Peak || Spacewatch || — || align=right | 1.8 km || 
|-id=835 bgcolor=#d6d6d6
| 233835 ||  || — || October 28, 2008 || Kitt Peak || Spacewatch || — || align=right | 3.1 km || 
|-id=836 bgcolor=#d6d6d6
| 233836 ||  || — || October 28, 2008 || Mount Lemmon || Mount Lemmon Survey || THM || align=right | 2.7 km || 
|-id=837 bgcolor=#d6d6d6
| 233837 ||  || — || October 28, 2008 || Mount Lemmon || Mount Lemmon Survey || — || align=right | 3.0 km || 
|-id=838 bgcolor=#d6d6d6
| 233838 ||  || — || October 28, 2008 || Mount Lemmon || Mount Lemmon Survey || THM || align=right | 3.3 km || 
|-id=839 bgcolor=#d6d6d6
| 233839 ||  || — || October 28, 2008 || Mount Lemmon || Mount Lemmon Survey || — || align=right | 2.2 km || 
|-id=840 bgcolor=#E9E9E9
| 233840 ||  || — || October 29, 2008 || Kitt Peak || Spacewatch || HEN || align=right | 1.5 km || 
|-id=841 bgcolor=#E9E9E9
| 233841 ||  || — || October 29, 2008 || Kitt Peak || Spacewatch || PAD || align=right | 2.4 km || 
|-id=842 bgcolor=#fefefe
| 233842 ||  || — || October 29, 2008 || Kitt Peak || Spacewatch || — || align=right | 1.4 km || 
|-id=843 bgcolor=#d6d6d6
| 233843 ||  || — || October 30, 2008 || Kitt Peak || Spacewatch || — || align=right | 2.7 km || 
|-id=844 bgcolor=#E9E9E9
| 233844 ||  || — || October 30, 2008 || Kitt Peak || Spacewatch || — || align=right | 3.2 km || 
|-id=845 bgcolor=#E9E9E9
| 233845 ||  || — || October 31, 2008 || Mount Lemmon || Mount Lemmon Survey || WIT || align=right | 1.2 km || 
|-id=846 bgcolor=#d6d6d6
| 233846 ||  || — || October 25, 2008 || Mount Lemmon || Mount Lemmon Survey || — || align=right | 3.1 km || 
|-id=847 bgcolor=#E9E9E9
| 233847 ||  || — || October 23, 2008 || Kitt Peak || Spacewatch || — || align=right | 1.7 km || 
|-id=848 bgcolor=#d6d6d6
| 233848 ||  || — || October 23, 2008 || Kitt Peak || Spacewatch || THM || align=right | 3.5 km || 
|-id=849 bgcolor=#fefefe
| 233849 ||  || — || October 28, 2008 || Kitt Peak || Spacewatch || — || align=right data-sort-value="0.98" | 980 m || 
|-id=850 bgcolor=#E9E9E9
| 233850 ||  || — || October 27, 2008 || Kitt Peak || Spacewatch || AST || align=right | 2.9 km || 
|-id=851 bgcolor=#E9E9E9
| 233851 ||  || — || October 24, 2008 || Kitt Peak || Spacewatch || — || align=right | 1.7 km || 
|-id=852 bgcolor=#d6d6d6
| 233852 ||  || — || October 26, 2008 || Catalina || CSS || — || align=right | 4.4 km || 
|-id=853 bgcolor=#d6d6d6
| 233853 ||  || — || October 25, 2008 || Mount Lemmon || Mount Lemmon Survey || KOR || align=right | 1.6 km || 
|-id=854 bgcolor=#d6d6d6
| 233854 ||  || — || October 26, 2008 || Socorro || LINEAR || — || align=right | 3.5 km || 
|-id=855 bgcolor=#E9E9E9
| 233855 ||  || — || November 2, 2008 || Socorro || LINEAR || — || align=right | 2.5 km || 
|-id=856 bgcolor=#fefefe
| 233856 ||  || — || November 3, 2008 || Socorro || LINEAR || — || align=right | 1.3 km || 
|-id=857 bgcolor=#d6d6d6
| 233857 ||  || — || November 7, 2008 || Socorro || LINEAR || EOS || align=right | 5.6 km || 
|-id=858 bgcolor=#E9E9E9
| 233858 ||  || — || November 2, 2008 || Mount Lemmon || Mount Lemmon Survey || — || align=right | 3.4 km || 
|-id=859 bgcolor=#d6d6d6
| 233859 ||  || — || November 1, 2008 || Kitt Peak || Spacewatch || — || align=right | 5.2 km || 
|-id=860 bgcolor=#E9E9E9
| 233860 ||  || — || November 1, 2008 || Kitt Peak || Spacewatch || — || align=right | 3.4 km || 
|-id=861 bgcolor=#d6d6d6
| 233861 ||  || — || November 2, 2008 || Mount Lemmon || Mount Lemmon Survey || HYG || align=right | 3.6 km || 
|-id=862 bgcolor=#E9E9E9
| 233862 ||  || — || November 2, 2008 || Kitt Peak || Spacewatch || — || align=right | 2.1 km || 
|-id=863 bgcolor=#E9E9E9
| 233863 ||  || — || November 3, 2008 || Mount Lemmon || Mount Lemmon Survey || — || align=right | 1.7 km || 
|-id=864 bgcolor=#d6d6d6
| 233864 ||  || — || November 7, 2008 || Catalina || CSS || SHU3:2 || align=right | 5.8 km || 
|-id=865 bgcolor=#E9E9E9
| 233865 ||  || — || November 7, 2008 || Mount Lemmon || Mount Lemmon Survey || — || align=right | 2.4 km || 
|-id=866 bgcolor=#E9E9E9
| 233866 ||  || — || November 1, 2008 || Mount Lemmon || Mount Lemmon Survey || — || align=right | 2.2 km || 
|-id=867 bgcolor=#d6d6d6
| 233867 ||  || — || November 19, 2008 || Socorro || LINEAR || — || align=right | 3.5 km || 
|-id=868 bgcolor=#d6d6d6
| 233868 ||  || — || November 17, 2008 || Kitt Peak || Spacewatch || — || align=right | 4.2 km || 
|-id=869 bgcolor=#E9E9E9
| 233869 ||  || — || November 17, 2008 || Kitt Peak || Spacewatch || AST || align=right | 2.2 km || 
|-id=870 bgcolor=#E9E9E9
| 233870 ||  || — || November 18, 2008 || Catalina || CSS || — || align=right | 3.0 km || 
|-id=871 bgcolor=#E9E9E9
| 233871 ||  || — || November 18, 2008 || Catalina || CSS || PAD || align=right | 4.0 km || 
|-id=872 bgcolor=#E9E9E9
| 233872 ||  || — || November 18, 2008 || Catalina || CSS || — || align=right | 3.2 km || 
|-id=873 bgcolor=#E9E9E9
| 233873 ||  || — || November 18, 2008 || Catalina || CSS || HOF || align=right | 3.1 km || 
|-id=874 bgcolor=#E9E9E9
| 233874 ||  || — || November 18, 2008 || Socorro || LINEAR || — || align=right | 2.5 km || 
|-id=875 bgcolor=#E9E9E9
| 233875 ||  || — || November 18, 2008 || Socorro || LINEAR || — || align=right | 2.3 km || 
|-id=876 bgcolor=#d6d6d6
| 233876 ||  || — || November 21, 2008 || Socorro || LINEAR || — || align=right | 3.7 km || 
|-id=877 bgcolor=#E9E9E9
| 233877 ||  || — || November 20, 2008 || Kitt Peak || Spacewatch || — || align=right | 3.0 km || 
|-id=878 bgcolor=#d6d6d6
| 233878 ||  || — || November 20, 2008 || Kitt Peak || Spacewatch || Tj (2.97) || align=right | 4.7 km || 
|-id=879 bgcolor=#d6d6d6
| 233879 ||  || — || November 23, 2008 || Mount Lemmon || Mount Lemmon Survey || EOS || align=right | 2.4 km || 
|-id=880 bgcolor=#d6d6d6
| 233880 Urbanpriol ||  ||  || November 26, 2008 || Wildberg || R. Apitzsch || — || align=right | 3.1 km || 
|-id=881 bgcolor=#E9E9E9
| 233881 ||  || — || November 30, 2008 || Catalina || CSS || — || align=right | 3.0 km || 
|-id=882 bgcolor=#E9E9E9
| 233882 ||  || — || November 23, 2008 || Kitt Peak || Spacewatch || GEF || align=right | 1.9 km || 
|-id=883 bgcolor=#E9E9E9
| 233883 ||  || — || December 3, 2008 || Socorro || LINEAR || — || align=right | 4.3 km || 
|-id=884 bgcolor=#fefefe
| 233884 ||  || — || December 1, 2008 || Catalina || CSS || — || align=right | 1.7 km || 
|-id=885 bgcolor=#E9E9E9
| 233885 ||  || — || December 1, 2008 || Catalina || CSS || — || align=right | 2.8 km || 
|-id=886 bgcolor=#d6d6d6
| 233886 ||  || — || December 1, 2008 || Kitt Peak || Spacewatch || — || align=right | 3.5 km || 
|-id=887 bgcolor=#E9E9E9
| 233887 ||  || — || December 1, 2008 || Kitt Peak || Spacewatch || — || align=right | 2.0 km || 
|-id=888 bgcolor=#E9E9E9
| 233888 ||  || — || December 3, 2008 || Kitt Peak || Spacewatch || — || align=right | 2.3 km || 
|-id=889 bgcolor=#d6d6d6
| 233889 ||  || — || December 2, 2008 || Kitt Peak || Spacewatch || — || align=right | 3.5 km || 
|-id=890 bgcolor=#d6d6d6
| 233890 ||  || — || December 1, 2008 || Socorro || LINEAR || — || align=right | 4.9 km || 
|-id=891 bgcolor=#d6d6d6
| 233891 ||  || — || December 1, 2008 || Kitt Peak || Spacewatch || — || align=right | 3.7 km || 
|-id=892 bgcolor=#d6d6d6
| 233892 ||  || — || December 22, 2008 || Dauban || F. Kugel || — || align=right | 3.9 km || 
|-id=893 bgcolor=#d6d6d6
| 233893 Honthyhanna ||  ||  || December 21, 2008 || Piszkéstető || K. Sárneczky || SHU3:2 || align=right | 5.2 km || 
|-id=894 bgcolor=#d6d6d6
| 233894 ||  || — || December 27, 2008 || Bisei SG Center || BATTeRS || HYG || align=right | 5.0 km || 
|-id=895 bgcolor=#E9E9E9
| 233895 ||  || — || December 29, 2008 || Mount Lemmon || Mount Lemmon Survey || — || align=right | 1.5 km || 
|-id=896 bgcolor=#E9E9E9
| 233896 ||  || — || December 30, 2008 || Mount Lemmon || Mount Lemmon Survey || — || align=right | 2.7 km || 
|-id=897 bgcolor=#fefefe
| 233897 ||  || — || December 30, 2008 || Kitt Peak || Spacewatch || KLI || align=right | 2.7 km || 
|-id=898 bgcolor=#E9E9E9
| 233898 ||  || — || December 30, 2008 || Kitt Peak || Spacewatch || — || align=right | 4.6 km || 
|-id=899 bgcolor=#E9E9E9
| 233899 ||  || — || January 2, 2009 || Kitt Peak || Spacewatch || — || align=right | 1.6 km || 
|-id=900 bgcolor=#d6d6d6
| 233900 ||  || — || January 3, 2009 || Kitt Peak || Spacewatch || — || align=right | 6.7 km || 
|}

233901–234000 

|-bgcolor=#d6d6d6
| 233901 ||  || — || January 16, 2009 || Mayhill || A. Lowe || — || align=right | 4.1 km || 
|-id=902 bgcolor=#E9E9E9
| 233902 ||  || — || January 18, 2009 || Socorro || LINEAR || — || align=right | 1.6 km || 
|-id=903 bgcolor=#E9E9E9
| 233903 ||  || — || January 16, 2009 || Kitt Peak || Spacewatch || AGN || align=right | 1.4 km || 
|-id=904 bgcolor=#d6d6d6
| 233904 ||  || — || January 29, 2009 || Mount Lemmon || Mount Lemmon Survey || — || align=right | 6.0 km || 
|-id=905 bgcolor=#E9E9E9
| 233905 ||  || — || February 1, 2009 || Kitt Peak || Spacewatch || GER || align=right | 3.2 km || 
|-id=906 bgcolor=#d6d6d6
| 233906 ||  || — || February 13, 2009 || Kitt Peak || Spacewatch || EMA || align=right | 4.3 km || 
|-id=907 bgcolor=#d6d6d6
| 233907 ||  || — || February 3, 2009 || Kitt Peak || Spacewatch || — || align=right | 6.8 km || 
|-id=908 bgcolor=#d6d6d6
| 233908 ||  || — || February 2, 2009 || Mount Lemmon || Mount Lemmon Survey || VER || align=right | 6.3 km || 
|-id=909 bgcolor=#E9E9E9
| 233909 ||  || — || February 21, 2009 || Catalina || CSS || — || align=right | 1.5 km || 
|-id=910 bgcolor=#d6d6d6
| 233910 ||  || — || March 17, 2009 || Bergisch Gladbac || W. Bickel || ALA || align=right | 7.2 km || 
|-id=911 bgcolor=#fefefe
| 233911 ||  || — || March 17, 2009 || Kitt Peak || Spacewatch || — || align=right data-sort-value="0.92" | 920 m || 
|-id=912 bgcolor=#fefefe
| 233912 ||  || — || July 3, 2009 || La Sagra || OAM Obs. || — || align=right | 1.8 km || 
|-id=913 bgcolor=#fefefe
| 233913 ||  || — || August 18, 2009 || Kitt Peak || Spacewatch || V || align=right data-sort-value="0.98" | 980 m || 
|-id=914 bgcolor=#d6d6d6
| 233914 ||  || — || September 11, 2009 || Catalina || CSS || TIR || align=right | 4.1 km || 
|-id=915 bgcolor=#C2FFFF
| 233915 ||  || — || September 14, 2009 || Kitt Peak || Spacewatch || L4 || align=right | 11 km || 
|-id=916 bgcolor=#d6d6d6
| 233916 ||  || — || September 19, 2009 || Kitt Peak || Spacewatch || THM || align=right | 3.0 km || 
|-id=917 bgcolor=#d6d6d6
| 233917 ||  || — || September 18, 2009 || Kitt Peak || Spacewatch || — || align=right | 4.0 km || 
|-id=918 bgcolor=#C2FFFF
| 233918 ||  || — || September 19, 2009 || Kitt Peak || Spacewatch || L4 || align=right | 9.3 km || 
|-id=919 bgcolor=#d6d6d6
| 233919 ||  || — || September 20, 2009 || Kitt Peak || Spacewatch || THM || align=right | 2.0 km || 
|-id=920 bgcolor=#E9E9E9
| 233920 ||  || — || September 21, 2009 || La Sagra || OAM Obs. || — || align=right | 3.4 km || 
|-id=921 bgcolor=#E9E9E9
| 233921 ||  || — || September 20, 2009 || Mount Lemmon || Mount Lemmon Survey || — || align=right | 1.4 km || 
|-id=922 bgcolor=#E9E9E9
| 233922 ||  || — || October 9, 2009 || La Sagra || OAM Obs. || — || align=right | 1.8 km || 
|-id=923 bgcolor=#d6d6d6
| 233923 ||  || — || October 11, 2009 || Mount Lemmon || Mount Lemmon Survey || — || align=right | 4.5 km || 
|-id=924 bgcolor=#d6d6d6
| 233924 ||  || — || October 14, 2009 || Mount Lemmon || Mount Lemmon Survey || EOS || align=right | 2.8 km || 
|-id=925 bgcolor=#C2FFFF
| 233925 ||  || — || October 18, 2009 || Tzec Maun || F. Tozzi || L4 || align=right | 16 km || 
|-id=926 bgcolor=#fefefe
| 233926 ||  || — || October 18, 2009 || Bisei SG Center || BATTeRS || MAS || align=right data-sort-value="0.81" | 810 m || 
|-id=927 bgcolor=#E9E9E9
| 233927 ||  || — || October 18, 2009 || Mount Lemmon || Mount Lemmon Survey || — || align=right | 2.5 km || 
|-id=928 bgcolor=#fefefe
| 233928 ||  || — || October 23, 2009 || Mount Lemmon || Mount Lemmon Survey || NYS || align=right data-sort-value="0.76" | 760 m || 
|-id=929 bgcolor=#fefefe
| 233929 ||  || — || October 23, 2009 || Mount Lemmon || Mount Lemmon Survey || NYS || align=right data-sort-value="0.65" | 650 m || 
|-id=930 bgcolor=#E9E9E9
| 233930 ||  || — || October 21, 2009 || Catalina || CSS || — || align=right | 3.0 km || 
|-id=931 bgcolor=#E9E9E9
| 233931 ||  || — || October 24, 2009 || Catalina || CSS || MRX || align=right | 1.4 km || 
|-id=932 bgcolor=#d6d6d6
| 233932 ||  || — || October 26, 2009 || Catalina || CSS || — || align=right | 5.2 km || 
|-id=933 bgcolor=#E9E9E9
| 233933 ||  || — || October 18, 2009 || Mount Lemmon || Mount Lemmon Survey || ADE || align=right | 3.3 km || 
|-id=934 bgcolor=#d6d6d6
| 233934 ||  || — || November 8, 2009 || Mount Lemmon || Mount Lemmon Survey || — || align=right | 7.8 km || 
|-id=935 bgcolor=#E9E9E9
| 233935 ||  || — || November 9, 2009 || Mount Lemmon || Mount Lemmon Survey || — || align=right | 3.0 km || 
|-id=936 bgcolor=#fefefe
| 233936 ||  || — || November 9, 2009 || Kitt Peak || Spacewatch || — || align=right | 1.1 km || 
|-id=937 bgcolor=#d6d6d6
| 233937 ||  || — || November 11, 2009 || La Sagra || OAM Obs. || — || align=right | 3.3 km || 
|-id=938 bgcolor=#d6d6d6
| 233938 ||  || — || November 12, 2009 || La Sagra || OAM Obs. || — || align=right | 5.3 km || 
|-id=939 bgcolor=#d6d6d6
| 233939 ||  || — || November 15, 2009 || Sierra Stars || W. G. Dillon, D. Wells || 3:2 || align=right | 5.1 km || 
|-id=940 bgcolor=#d6d6d6
| 233940 ||  || — || November 15, 2009 || Catalina || CSS || — || align=right | 5.1 km || 
|-id=941 bgcolor=#d6d6d6
| 233941 ||  || — || November 16, 2009 || Mount Lemmon || Mount Lemmon Survey || THM || align=right | 2.3 km || 
|-id=942 bgcolor=#d6d6d6
| 233942 ||  || — || November 18, 2009 || Mayhill || A. Lowe || — || align=right | 3.7 km || 
|-id=943 bgcolor=#d6d6d6
| 233943 Falera ||  ||  || November 21, 2009 || Falera || J. De Queiroz || EOS || align=right | 2.6 km || 
|-id=944 bgcolor=#E9E9E9
| 233944 ||  || — || November 18, 2009 || Kitt Peak || Spacewatch || WIT || align=right | 3.6 km || 
|-id=945 bgcolor=#fefefe
| 233945 ||  || — || November 18, 2009 || Kitt Peak || Spacewatch || MAS || align=right data-sort-value="0.83" | 830 m || 
|-id=946 bgcolor=#E9E9E9
| 233946 ||  || — || November 20, 2009 || Kitt Peak || Spacewatch || AGN || align=right | 1.8 km || 
|-id=947 bgcolor=#E9E9E9
| 233947 ||  || — || November 18, 2009 || Mount Lemmon || Mount Lemmon Survey || MAR || align=right | 1.7 km || 
|-id=948 bgcolor=#E9E9E9
| 233948 ||  || — || November 22, 2009 || Kitt Peak || Spacewatch || HOF || align=right | 4.7 km || 
|-id=949 bgcolor=#FA8072
| 233949 ||  || — || November 27, 2009 || Siding Spring || SSS || — || align=right | 1.2 km || 
|-id=950 bgcolor=#d6d6d6
| 233950 ||  || — || November 26, 2009 || Kitt Peak || Spacewatch || SHU3:2 || align=right | 5.7 km || 
|-id=951 bgcolor=#d6d6d6
| 233951 || 2009 XJ || — || December 7, 2009 || Pla D'Arguines || R. Ferrando || — || align=right | 3.4 km || 
|-id=952 bgcolor=#fefefe
| 233952 ||  || — || December 12, 2009 || Socorro || LINEAR || — || align=right | 1.4 km || 
|-id=953 bgcolor=#d6d6d6
| 233953 ||  || — || December 15, 2009 || Mount Lemmon || Mount Lemmon Survey || — || align=right | 5.4 km || 
|-id=954 bgcolor=#d6d6d6
| 233954 ||  || — || December 15, 2009 || Mount Lemmon || Mount Lemmon Survey || — || align=right | 5.4 km || 
|-id=955 bgcolor=#d6d6d6
| 233955 ||  || — || December 15, 2009 || Mount Lemmon || Mount Lemmon Survey || EOS || align=right | 4.2 km || 
|-id=956 bgcolor=#fefefe
| 233956 ||  || — || December 15, 2009 || Mount Lemmon || Mount Lemmon Survey || V || align=right data-sort-value="0.92" | 920 m || 
|-id=957 bgcolor=#fefefe
| 233957 ||  || — || December 19, 2009 || Bisei SG Center || BATTeRS || — || align=right data-sort-value="0.86" | 860 m || 
|-id=958 bgcolor=#E9E9E9
| 233958 ||  || — || December 27, 2009 || Kitt Peak || Spacewatch || — || align=right | 2.6 km || 
|-id=959 bgcolor=#E9E9E9
| 233959 ||  || — || December 17, 2009 || Mount Lemmon || Mount Lemmon Survey || — || align=right | 1.6 km || 
|-id=960 bgcolor=#d6d6d6
| 233960 ||  || — || January 7, 2010 || Mayhill || A. Lowe || — || align=right | 5.7 km || 
|-id=961 bgcolor=#E9E9E9
| 233961 ||  || — || January 7, 2010 || Mayhill || A. Lowe || — || align=right | 3.8 km || 
|-id=962 bgcolor=#E9E9E9
| 233962 ||  || — || January 6, 2010 || Catalina || CSS || — || align=right | 4.1 km || 
|-id=963 bgcolor=#E9E9E9
| 233963 ||  || — || January 6, 2010 || Kitt Peak || Spacewatch || — || align=right | 1.2 km || 
|-id=964 bgcolor=#fefefe
| 233964 ||  || — || January 7, 2010 || Kitt Peak || Spacewatch || — || align=right | 1.0 km || 
|-id=965 bgcolor=#fefefe
| 233965 ||  || — || January 6, 2010 || Catalina || CSS || FLO || align=right | 1.6 km || 
|-id=966 bgcolor=#E9E9E9
| 233966 ||  || — || January 16, 2010 || Mayhill || iTelescope Obs. || — || align=right | 3.5 km || 
|-id=967 bgcolor=#E9E9E9
| 233967 Vierkant ||  ||  || January 24, 2010 || Sierra Stars || R. Kracht || — || align=right | 3.4 km || 
|-id=968 bgcolor=#E9E9E9
| 233968 || 3021 T-2 || — || September 30, 1973 || Palomar || PLS || — || align=right | 1.7 km || 
|-id=969 bgcolor=#E9E9E9
| 233969 ||  || — || July 24, 1979 || Siding Spring || S. J. Bus || — || align=right | 2.1 km || 
|-id=970 bgcolor=#E9E9E9
| 233970 ||  || — || March 7, 1981 || Siding Spring || S. J. Bus || EUN || align=right | 1.8 km || 
|-id=971 bgcolor=#fefefe
| 233971 ||  || — || October 8, 1991 || Kitt Peak || Spacewatch || — || align=right data-sort-value="0.97" | 970 m || 
|-id=972 bgcolor=#FA8072
| 233972 ||  || — || August 3, 1992 || Palomar || H. E. Holt || — || align=right | 1.2 km || 
|-id=973 bgcolor=#d6d6d6
| 233973 ||  || — || March 17, 1993 || La Silla || UESAC || — || align=right | 5.3 km || 
|-id=974 bgcolor=#E9E9E9
| 233974 ||  || — || March 19, 1993 || La Silla || UESAC || PAD || align=right | 2.8 km || 
|-id=975 bgcolor=#E9E9E9
| 233975 ||  || — || September 12, 1994 || Kitt Peak || Spacewatch || PAD || align=right | 2.8 km || 
|-id=976 bgcolor=#E9E9E9
| 233976 ||  || — || September 12, 1994 || Kitt Peak || Spacewatch || — || align=right | 3.3 km || 
|-id=977 bgcolor=#E9E9E9
| 233977 ||  || — || October 28, 1994 || Kitt Peak || Spacewatch || — || align=right | 1.9 km || 
|-id=978 bgcolor=#fefefe
| 233978 ||  || — || March 26, 1995 || Kitt Peak || Spacewatch || — || align=right | 1.0 km || 
|-id=979 bgcolor=#d6d6d6
| 233979 ||  || — || June 4, 1995 || Kitt Peak || Spacewatch || — || align=right | 3.0 km || 
|-id=980 bgcolor=#d6d6d6
| 233980 ||  || — || July 2, 1995 || Kitt Peak || Spacewatch || HIL3:2 || align=right | 7.8 km || 
|-id=981 bgcolor=#d6d6d6
| 233981 ||  || — || July 22, 1995 || Kitt Peak || Spacewatch || — || align=right | 3.9 km || 
|-id=982 bgcolor=#d6d6d6
| 233982 ||  || — || August 3, 1995 || Kitt Peak || Spacewatch || THM || align=right | 2.4 km || 
|-id=983 bgcolor=#d6d6d6
| 233983 ||  || — || September 18, 1995 || Kitt Peak || Spacewatch || — || align=right | 3.8 km || 
|-id=984 bgcolor=#E9E9E9
| 233984 ||  || — || September 18, 1995 || Kitt Peak || Spacewatch || — || align=right data-sort-value="0.97" | 970 m || 
|-id=985 bgcolor=#d6d6d6
| 233985 ||  || — || September 20, 1995 || Kitt Peak || Spacewatch || HYG || align=right | 3.5 km || 
|-id=986 bgcolor=#d6d6d6
| 233986 ||  || — || September 22, 1995 || Kitt Peak || Spacewatch || — || align=right | 4.3 km || 
|-id=987 bgcolor=#fefefe
| 233987 ||  || — || October 27, 1995 || Kitt Peak || Spacewatch || — || align=right data-sort-value="0.83" | 830 m || 
|-id=988 bgcolor=#E9E9E9
| 233988 ||  || — || November 14, 1995 || Kitt Peak || Spacewatch || — || align=right | 1.8 km || 
|-id=989 bgcolor=#fefefe
| 233989 ||  || — || November 14, 1995 || Kitt Peak || Spacewatch || — || align=right data-sort-value="0.63" | 630 m || 
|-id=990 bgcolor=#E9E9E9
| 233990 ||  || — || November 17, 1995 || Kitt Peak || Spacewatch || — || align=right | 2.2 km || 
|-id=991 bgcolor=#E9E9E9
| 233991 ||  || — || November 18, 1995 || Kitt Peak || Spacewatch || — || align=right | 2.0 km || 
|-id=992 bgcolor=#fefefe
| 233992 ||  || — || April 9, 1996 || Kitt Peak || Spacewatch || FLO || align=right data-sort-value="0.89" | 890 m || 
|-id=993 bgcolor=#E9E9E9
| 233993 ||  || — || April 11, 1996 || Kitt Peak || Spacewatch || HOF || align=right | 2.8 km || 
|-id=994 bgcolor=#E9E9E9
| 233994 ||  || — || September 5, 1996 || Kitt Peak || Spacewatch || — || align=right | 2.8 km || 
|-id=995 bgcolor=#d6d6d6
| 233995 ||  || — || September 13, 1996 || Kitt Peak || Spacewatch || — || align=right | 2.9 km || 
|-id=996 bgcolor=#fefefe
| 233996 ||  || — || September 7, 1996 || Kitt Peak || Spacewatch || — || align=right | 1.1 km || 
|-id=997 bgcolor=#d6d6d6
| 233997 ||  || — || September 17, 1996 || Kitt Peak || Spacewatch || — || align=right | 4.1 km || 
|-id=998 bgcolor=#d6d6d6
| 233998 ||  || — || October 4, 1996 || Kitt Peak || Spacewatch || — || align=right | 3.3 km || 
|-id=999 bgcolor=#d6d6d6
| 233999 ||  || — || November 9, 1996 || Kitt Peak || Spacewatch || EOS || align=right | 3.9 km || 
|-id=000 bgcolor=#E9E9E9
| 234000 ||  || — || December 8, 1996 || Oizumi || T. Kobayashi || — || align=right | 3.3 km || 
|}

References

External links 
 Discovery Circumstances: Numbered Minor Planets (230001)–(235000) (IAU Minor Planet Center)

0233